= Minor Arcana =

Type of occult tarot cards

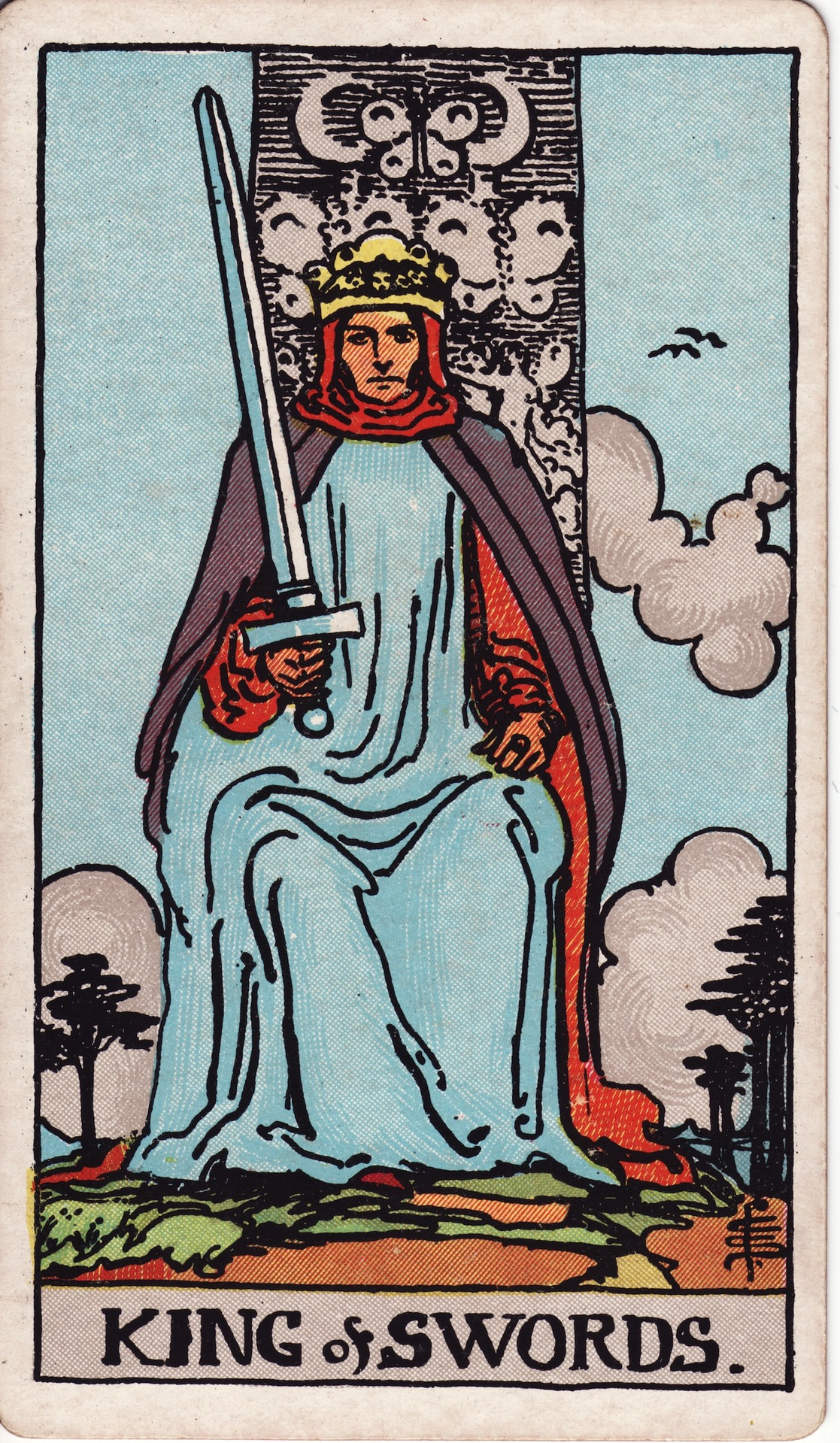
The King of Swords card from the Rider–Waite tarot

The Minor Arcana, sometimes known as the Lesser Arcana, are the suit cards in a cartomantic tarot deck.

Ordinary tarot cards first appeared in northern Italy in the 1440s and were designed for tarot card games. They typically have four suits each of 10 unillustrated pip cards numbered one (ace) to ten, along with 4 court cards (face cards). Tarot games are still widely played in central and southern Europe; French Tarot is the second most popular card game in France after Belote.

By contrast, cartomantic tarot cards emerged in France in the late 18th century, popularised by occultists such as Etteilla. The terms "Major" and "Minor Arcana" originate with Jean-Baptiste Pitois (1811–1877), nom de plume Paul Christian.

In their contemporary versions, the Minor Arcana are often illustrated—a convention popularized by the Rider–Waite tarot in 1910. Used in a tarot card reading in conjunction with the Major Arcana, the cards of the Minor Arcana suggest subtleties and details, and signify day-to-day insights.

Cartomantic tarot cards derived from Latin-suited packs typically have a Minor Arcana of 56 cards, with 14 cards in each suit: Wands (alternately batons, clubs, staffs, or staves), Cups (chalices, goblets, or vessels), Swords (or blades), and Coins (pentacles, disks, or rings).

Originally, the court cards consisted of the king, knight, and the page (jack or knave). Many early tarot decks had added female ranks into the face cards, including the Cary-Yale deck which added queens, mounted ladies, and maids (maidens or damsels) as counterparts to the males, resulting in six court cards. Some variations have princess and prince cards replacing the page, maid, knight, and mounted lady cards, reducing it to four; some added the princess and prince, resulting in eight court cards.

While the historical Tarot of Marseilles contains 56 cards, later packs based on the French suits of clubs (♣), hearts (♥), spades (♠), and diamonds (♦) have only three court cards per suit, with a jack in addition to the queen and king. While mounted ladies, maidens faded away or survive in minor regional patterns like the Tarocco Siciliano, knights were dropped in favour of queens in non-tarot French decks. In contemporary times, only four court cards are commonly used: the original three male cards (page, knight, and king) and one female card (queen). Some decks use a female representation of the page.

== Symbolism ==
In divinatory, esoteric and occult tarot, the Minor Arcana are believed to represent relatively mundane features of life. The court cards may represent the people whom one meets.

Each suit also has distinctive characteristics and connotations commonly held to be as follows:

Latin suit	French suit	Element	Class	Faculty
Wands, batons, clubs, staves	♣️ Clubs	Fire	Artisans	Will and creativity, or physical attraction and anger
Swords, blades	♠️ Spades	Air	Nobility and military	Reason or logic, wisdom, and intellect
Cups, chalices, goblets, vessels	♥️ Hearts	Water	Clergy	Spiritual matters, or emotions and love
Pentacles, coins, disks, rings	♦️ Diamonds	Earth	Merchants	Material matters, or possessions and career

== Gallery of card suits ==
Illustrations from the Rider–Waite tarot, the most popular amongst English speakers, divided by suit and arranged in ascending order of face value.

=== Cups ===
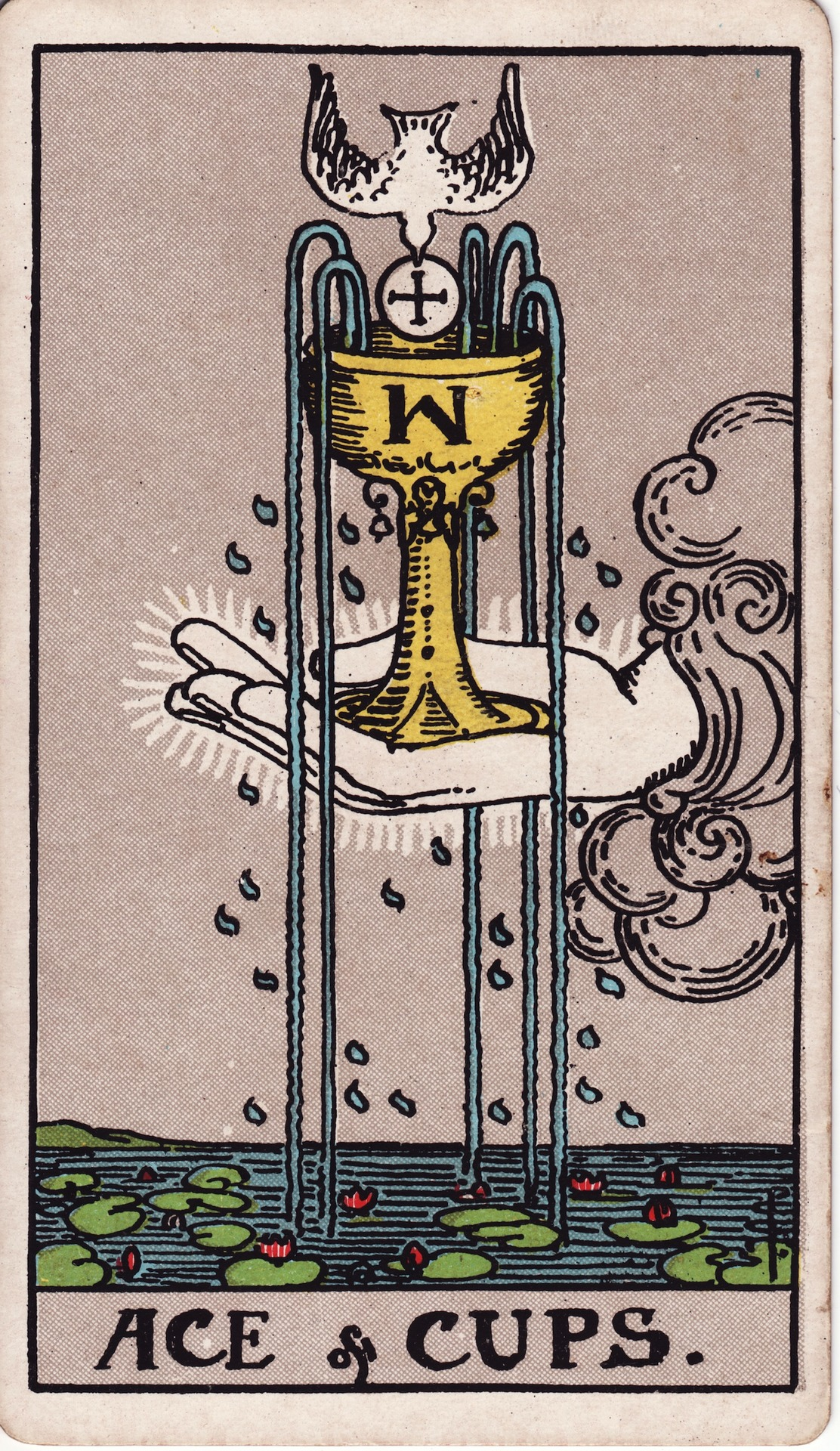
Ace of Cups

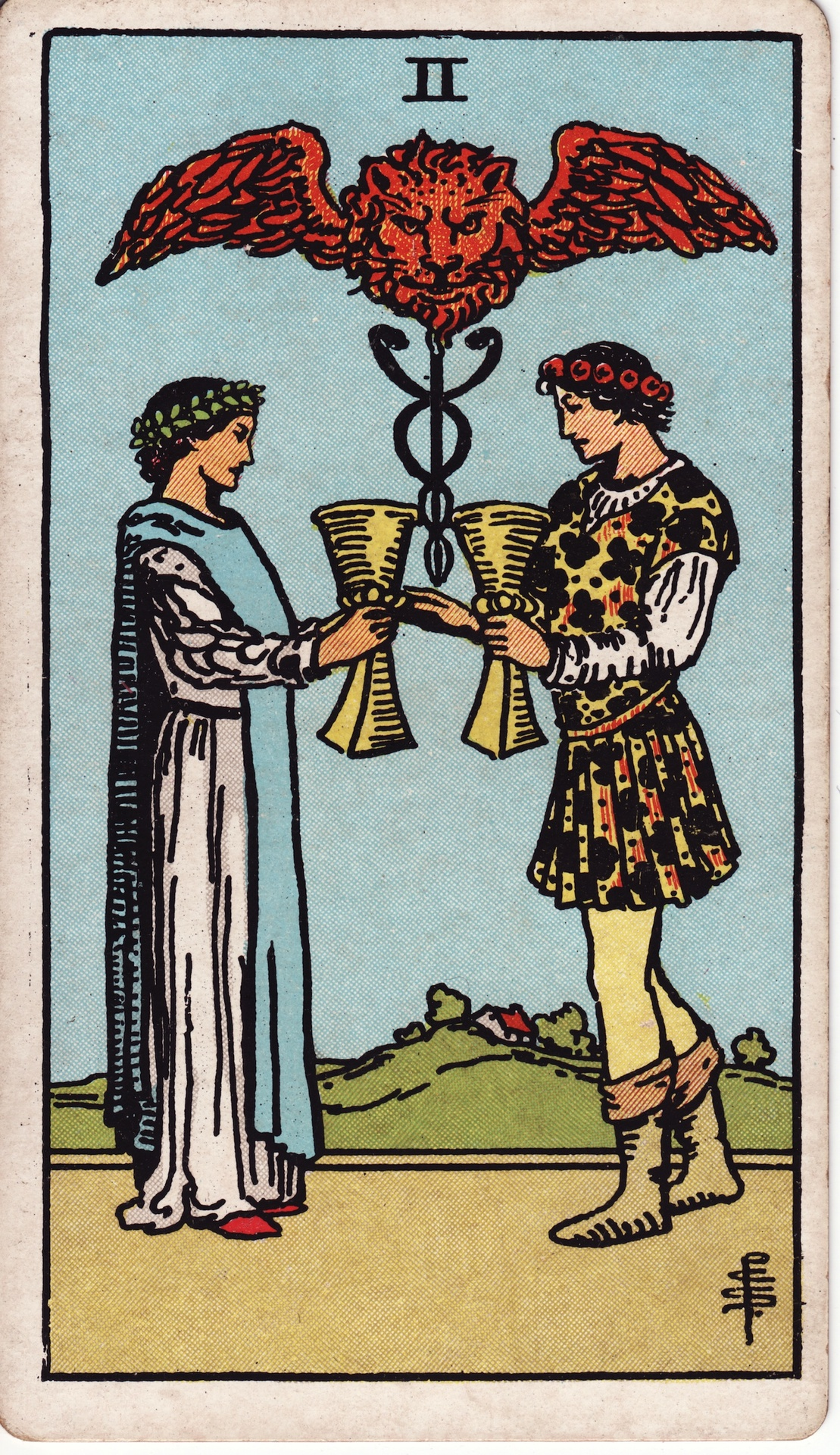
Two of Cups

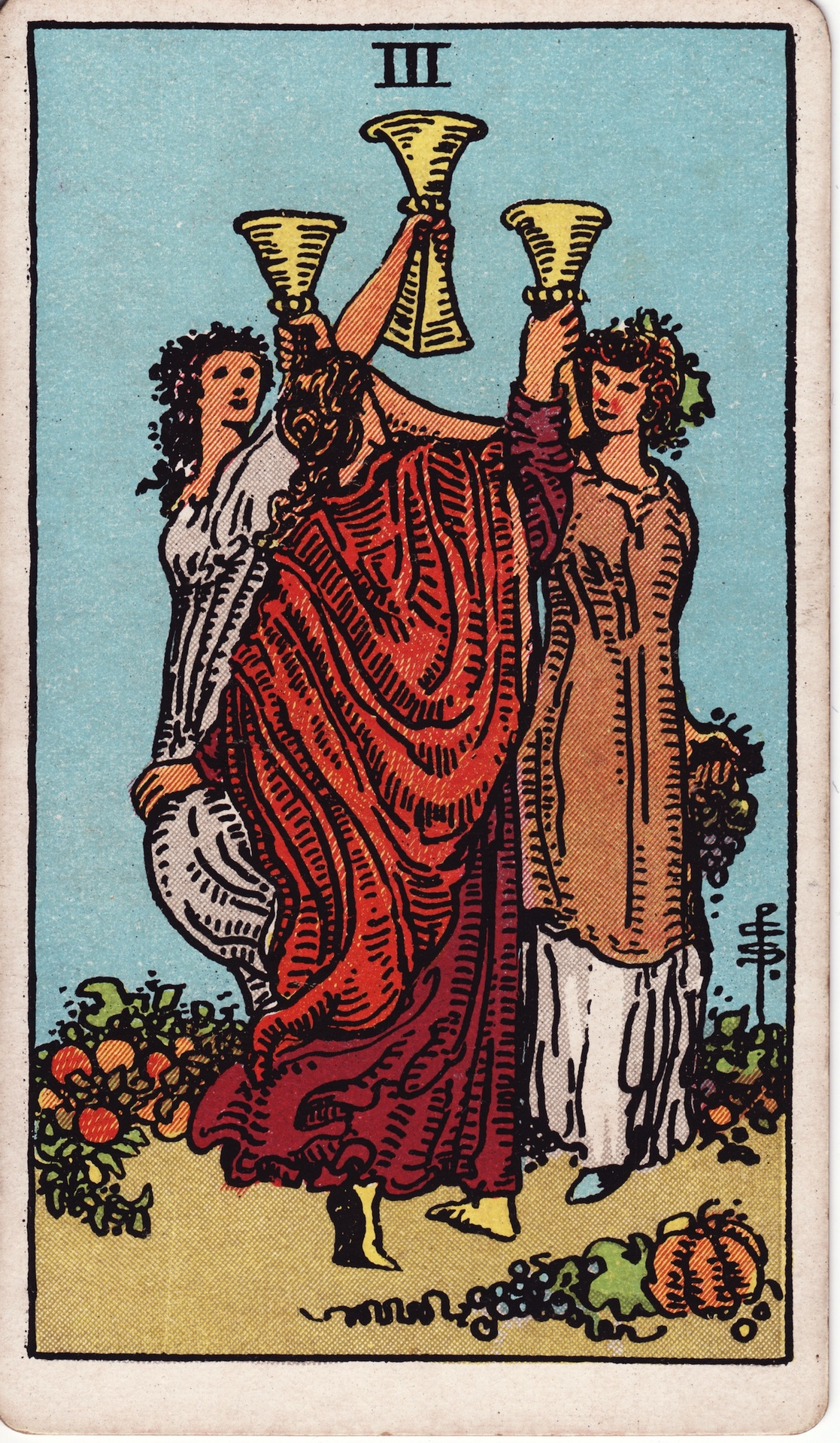
Three of Cups

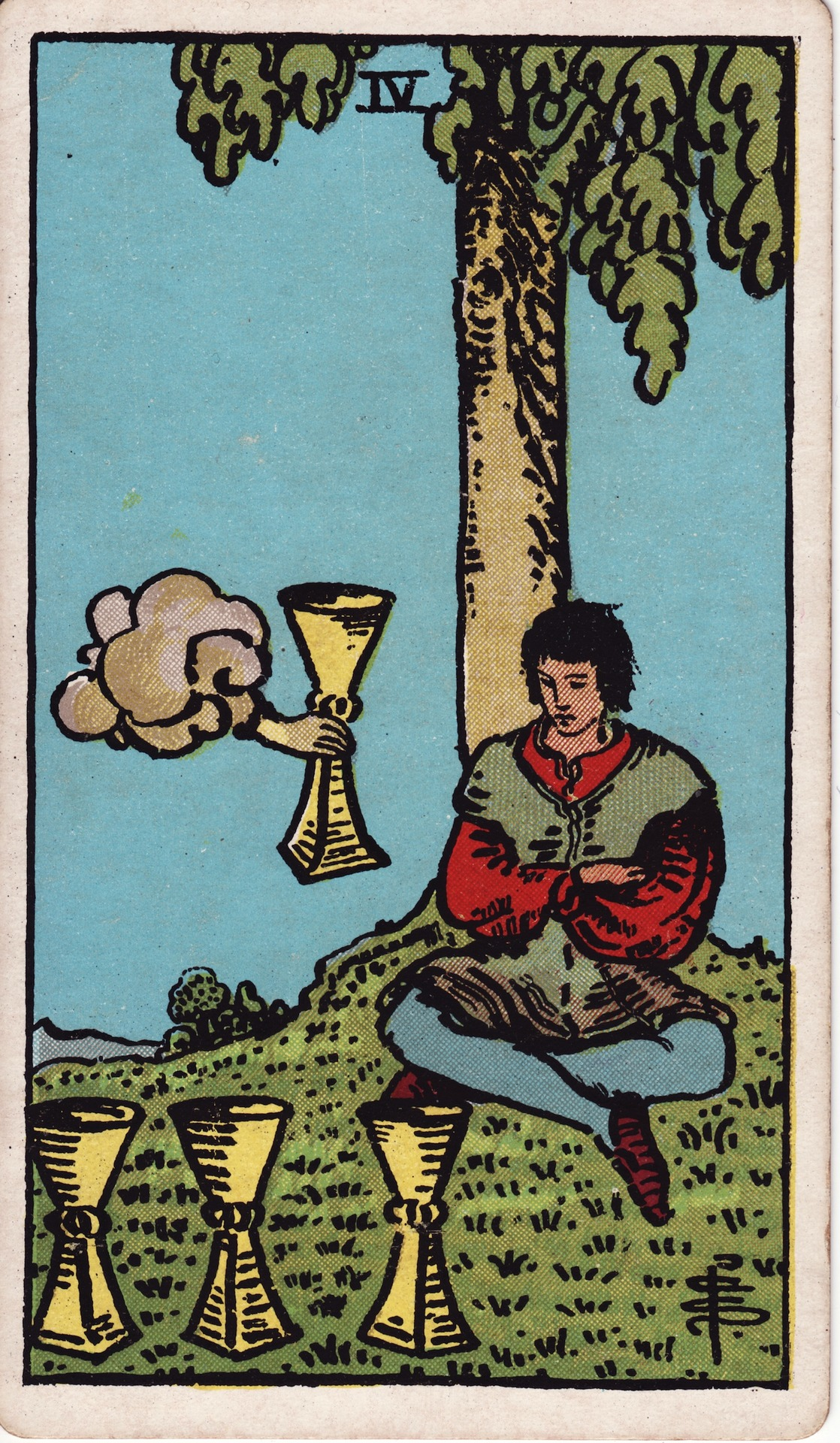
Four of Cups

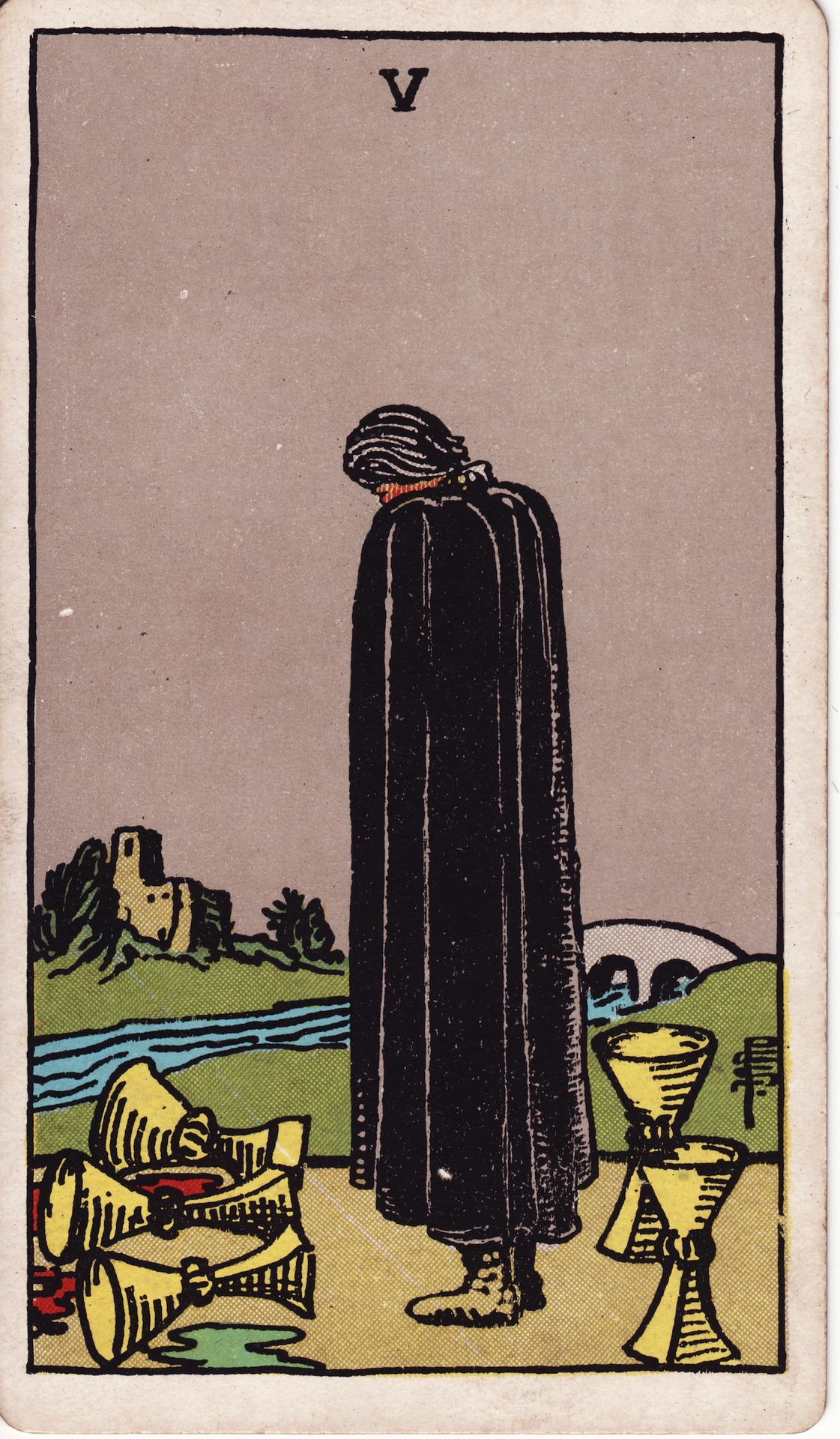
Five of Cups

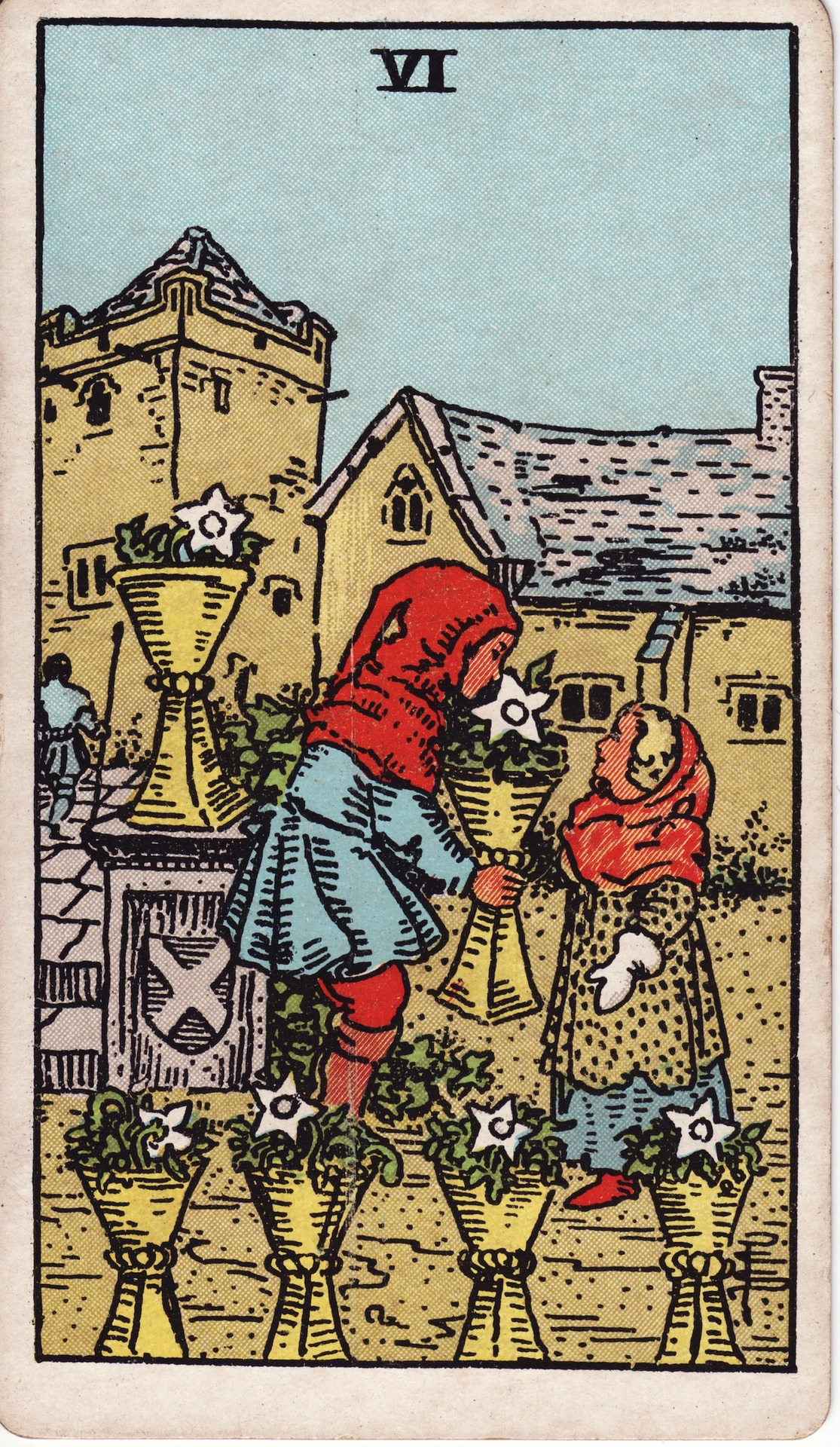
Six of Cups

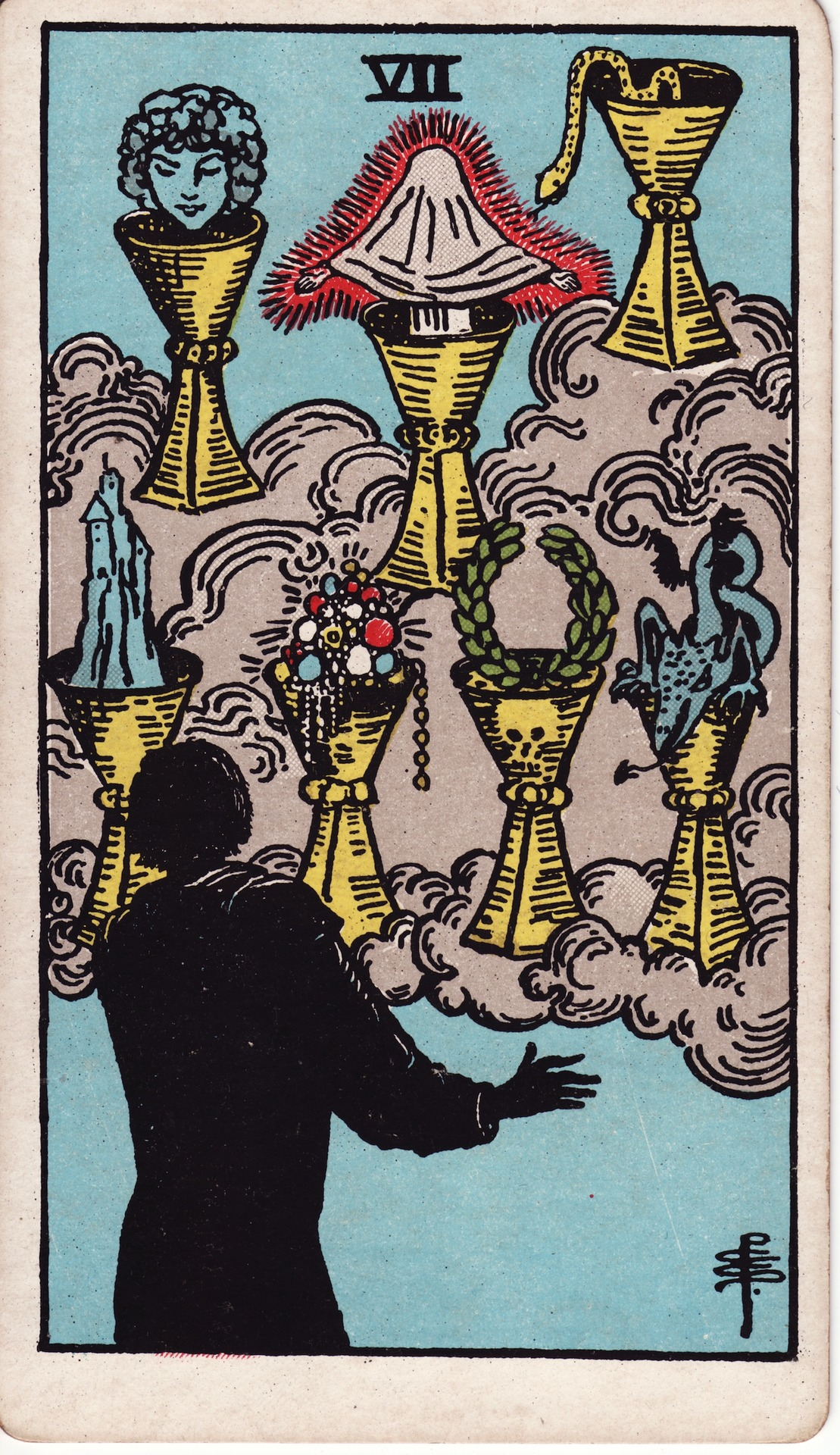
Seven of Cups

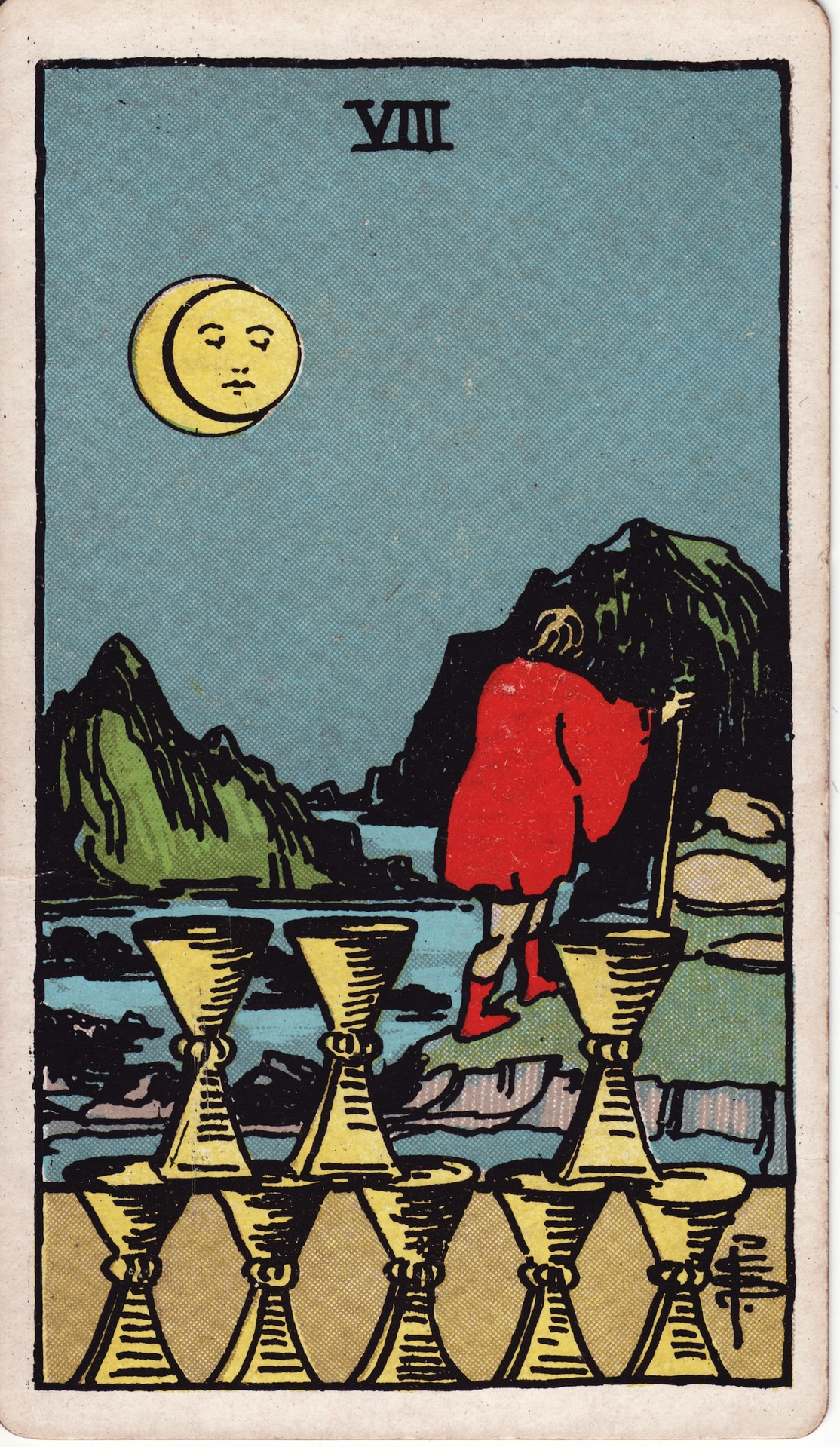
Eight of Cups

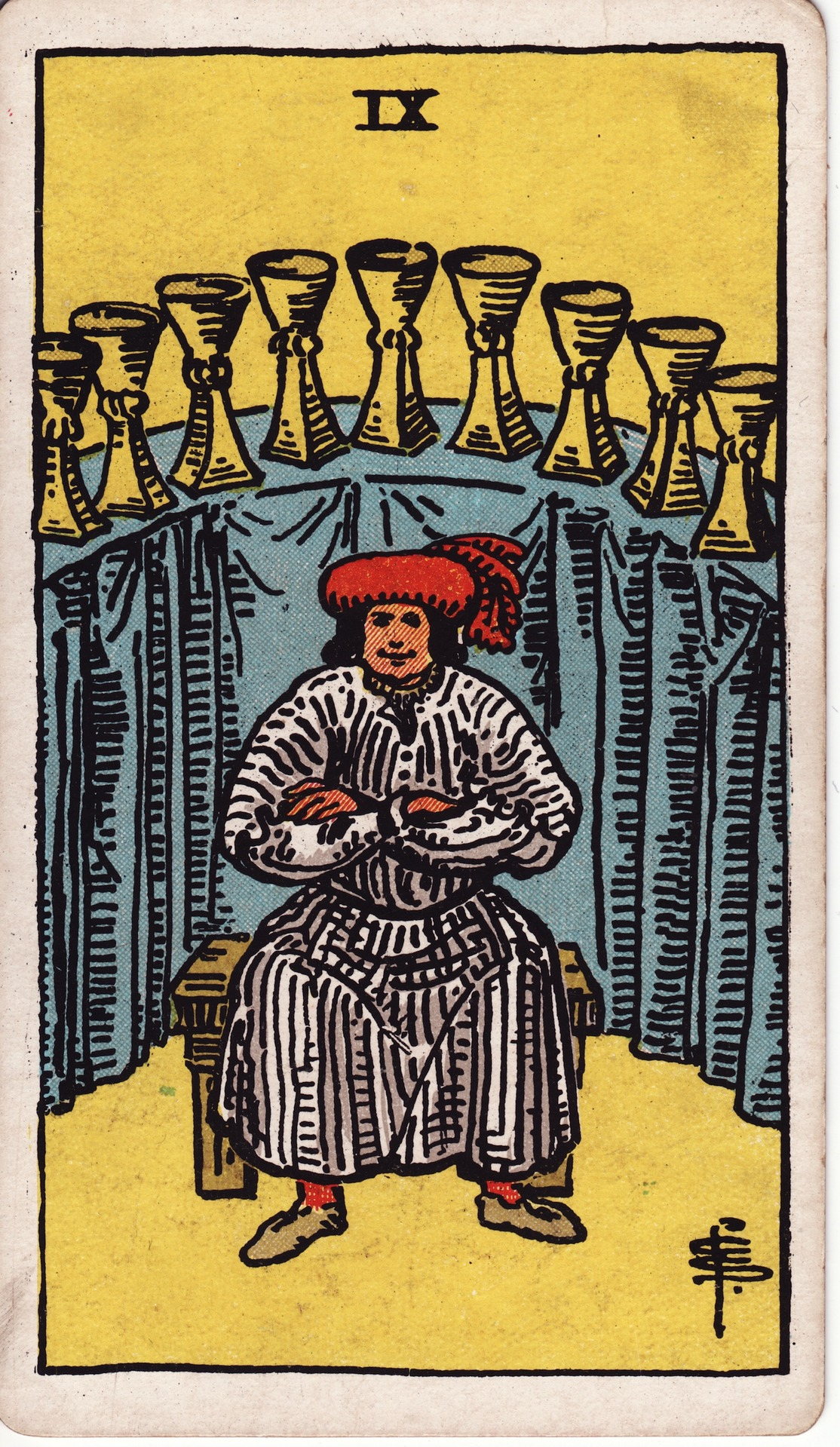
Nine of Cups

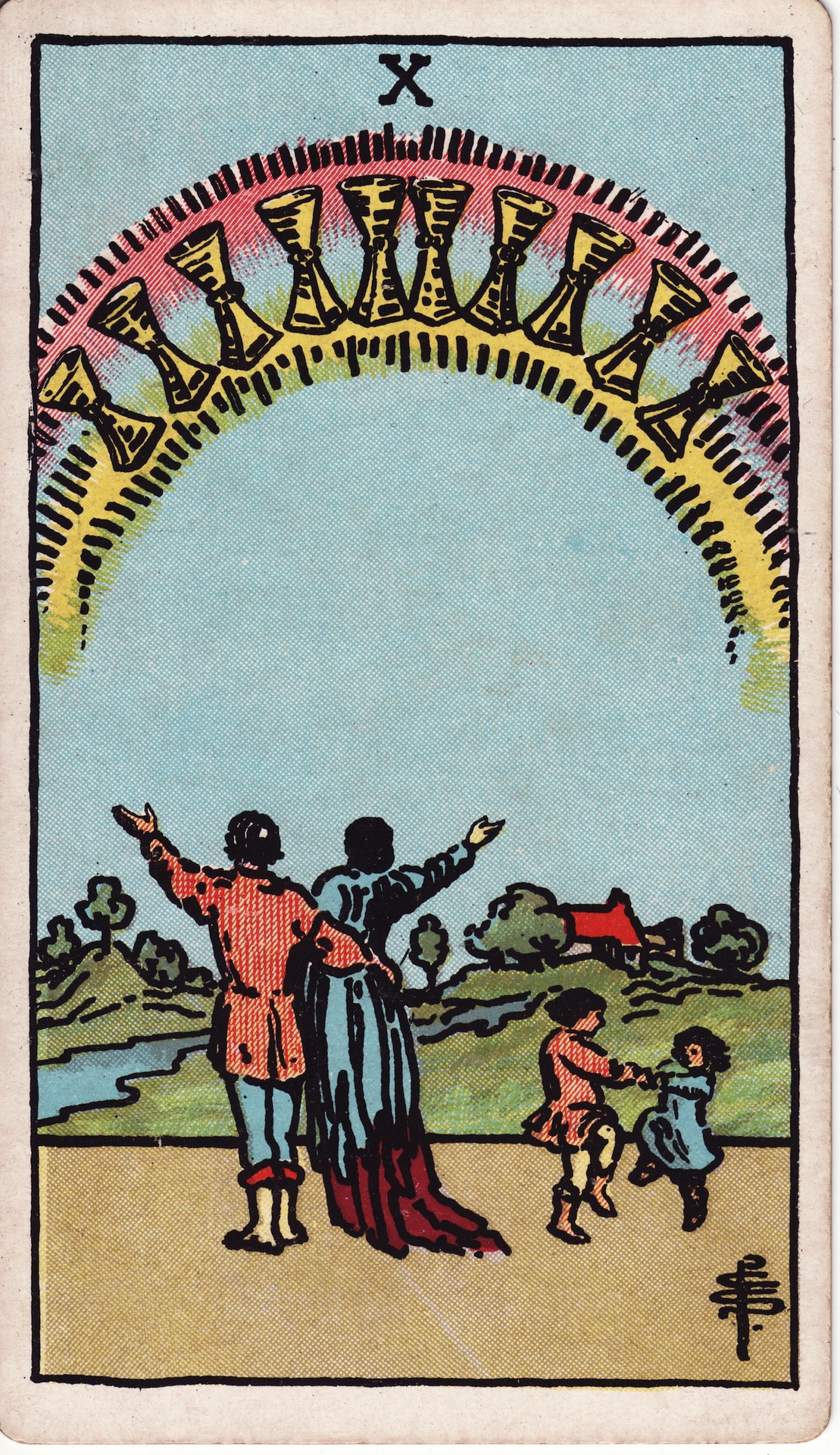
Ten of Cups
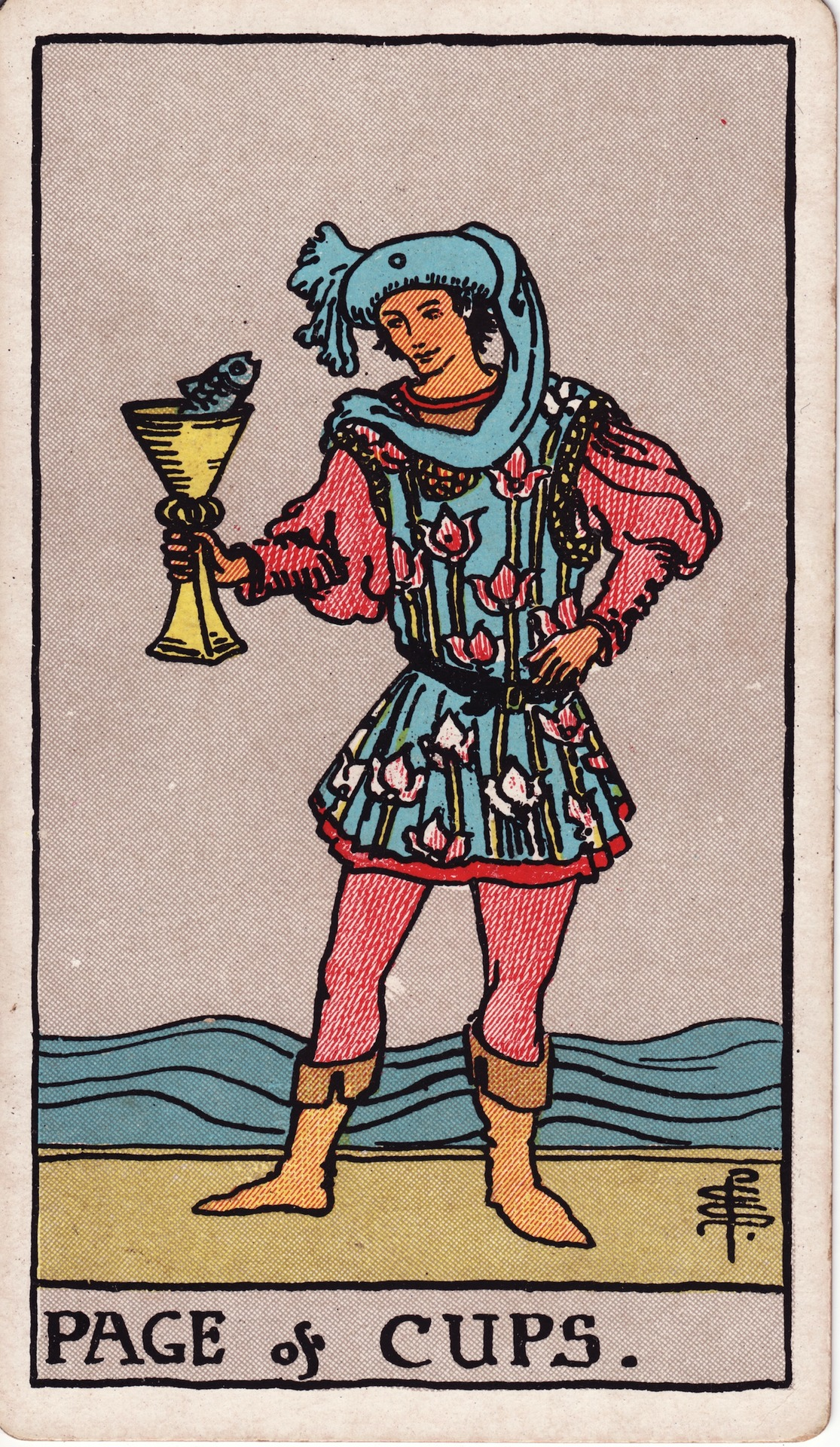
Page of Cups

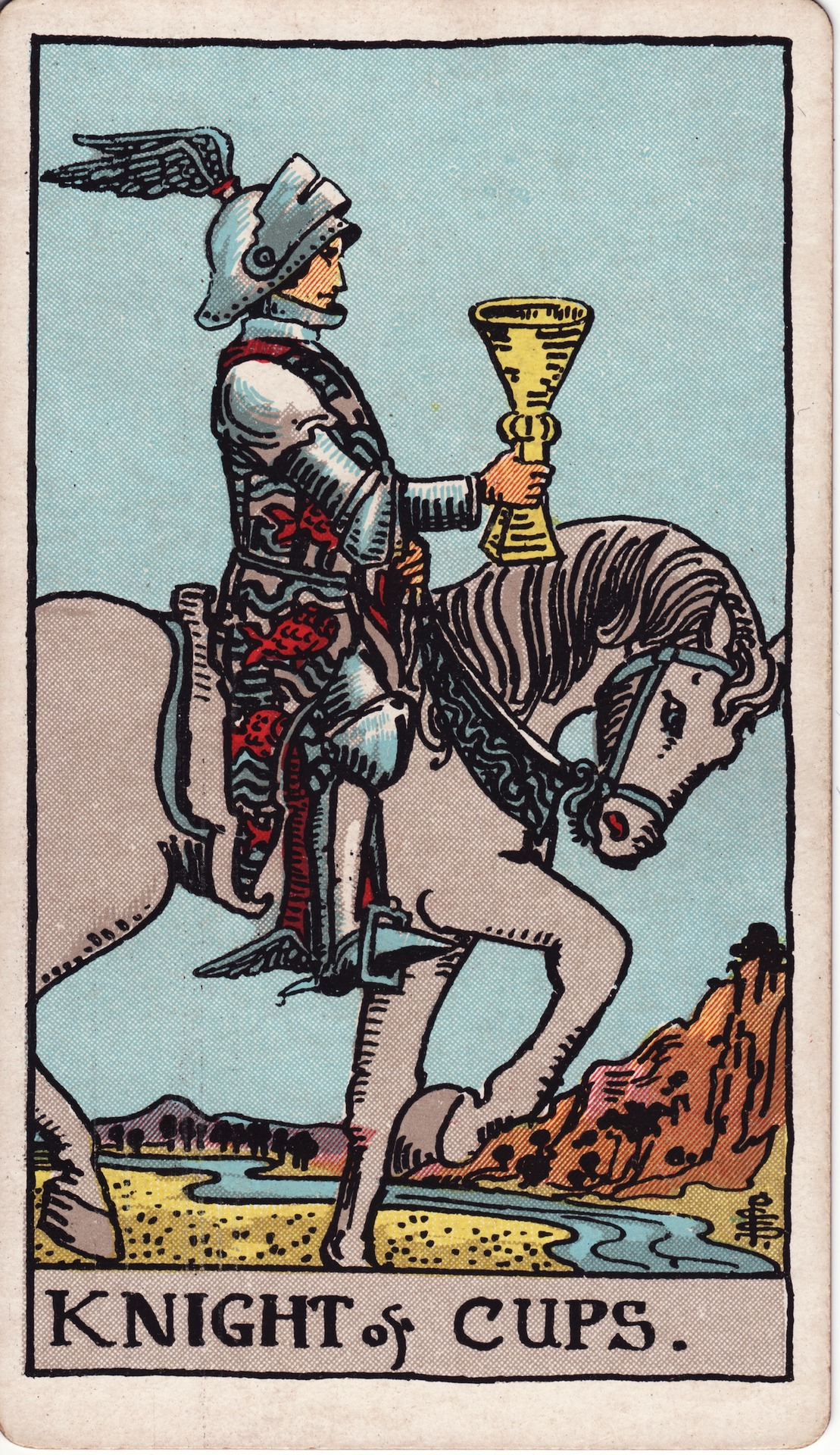
Knight of Cups

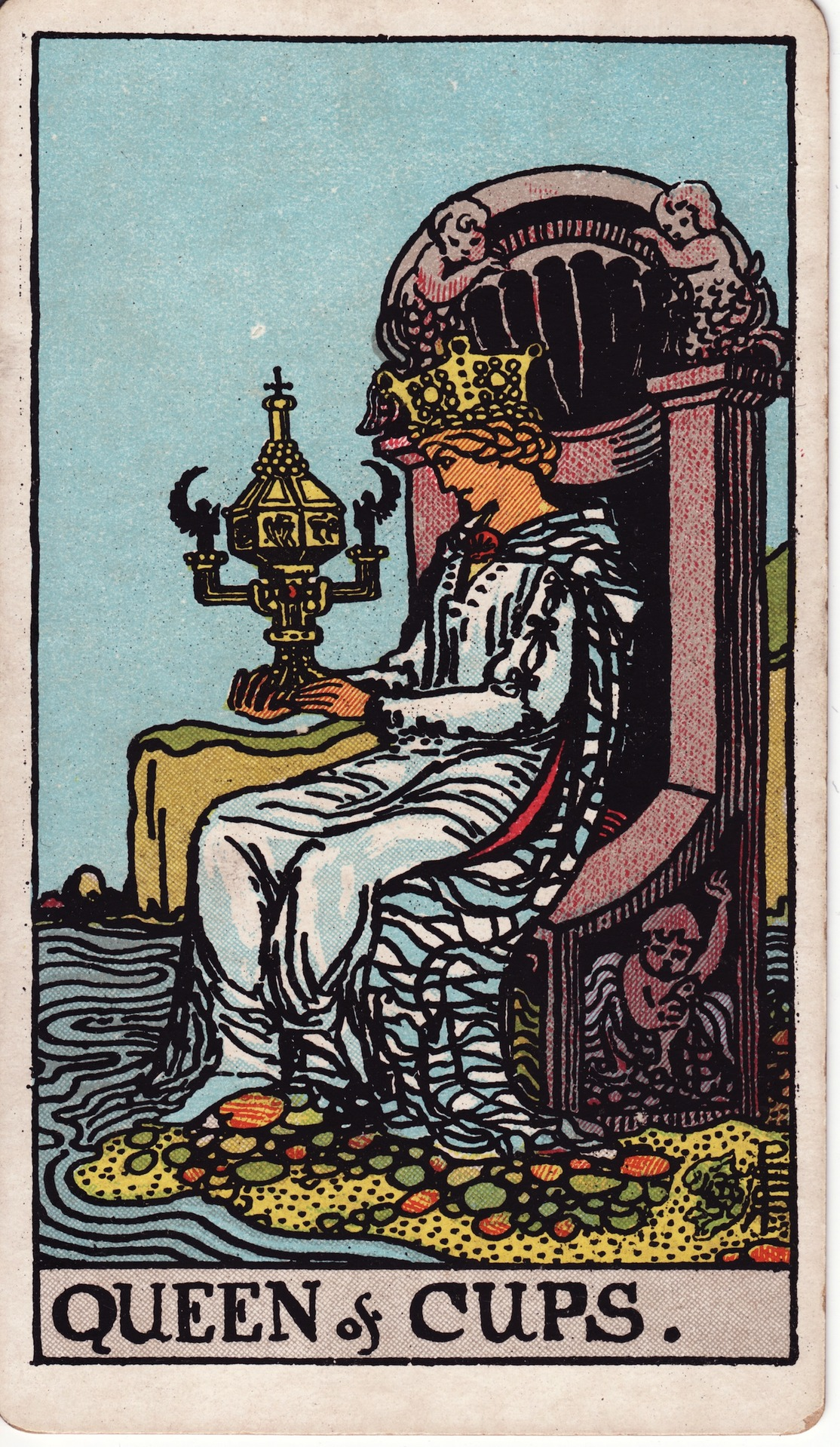
Queen of Cups

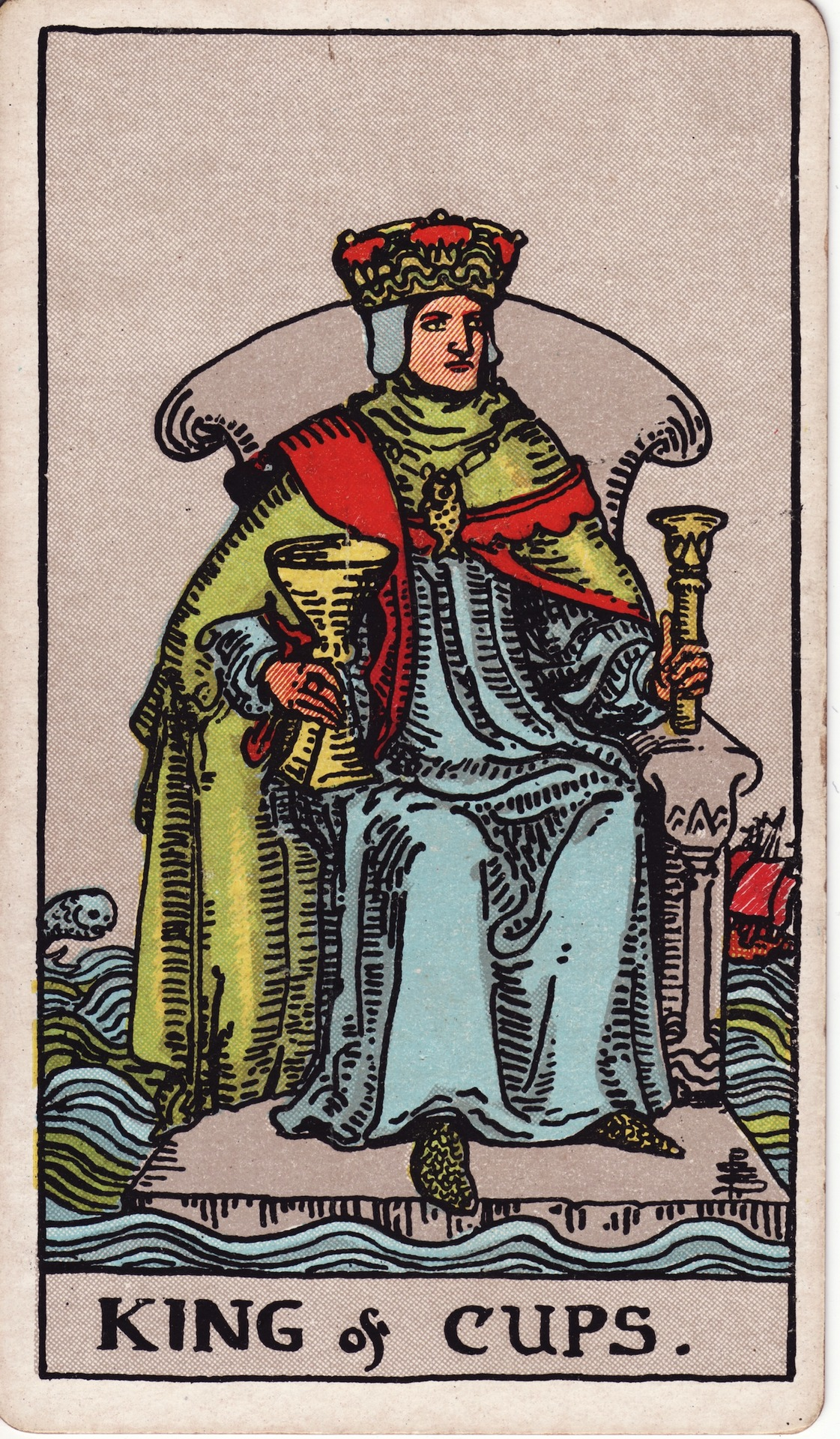
King of Cups

=== Pentacles ===
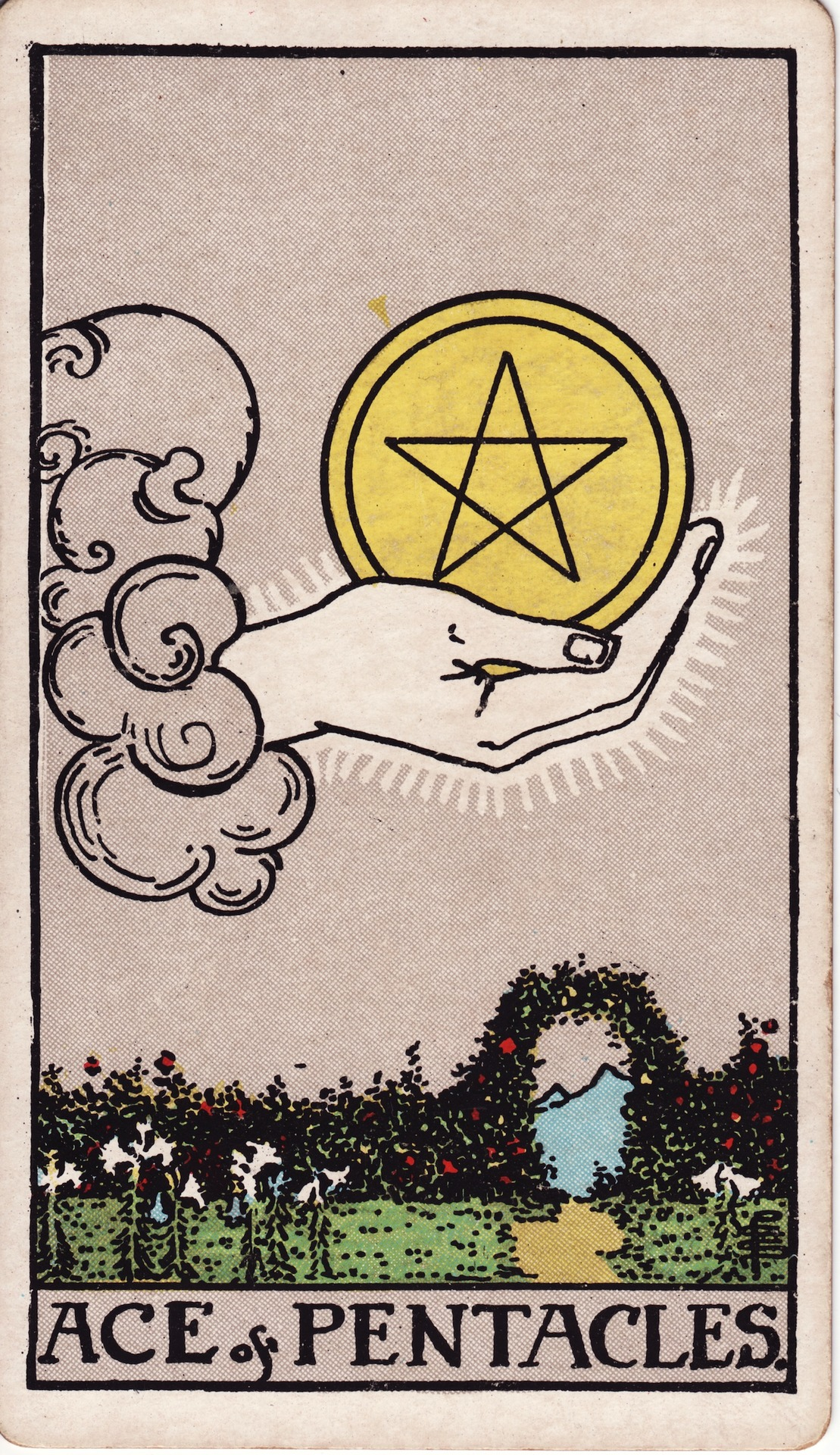
Ace of Pentacles

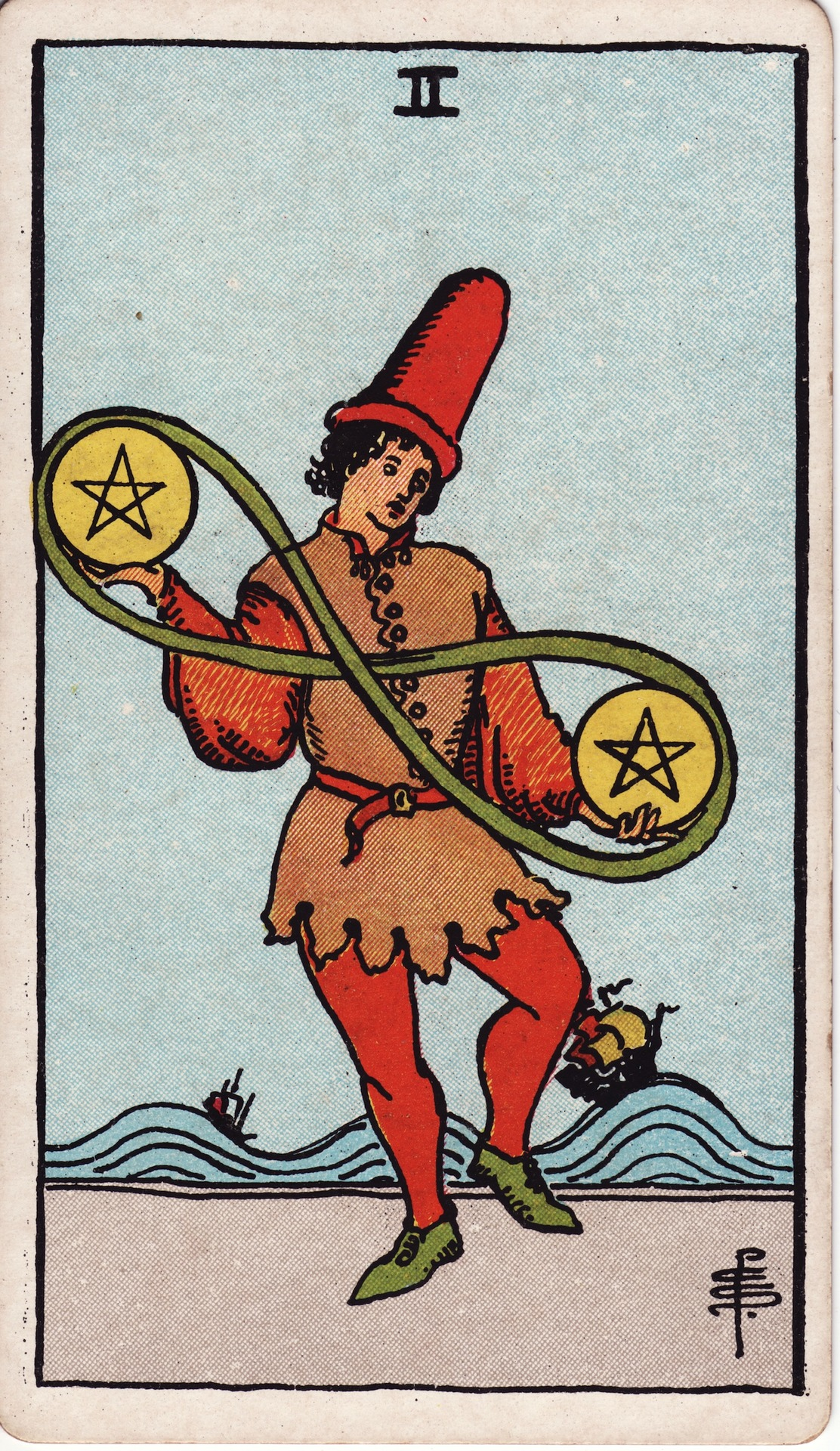
Two of Pentacles

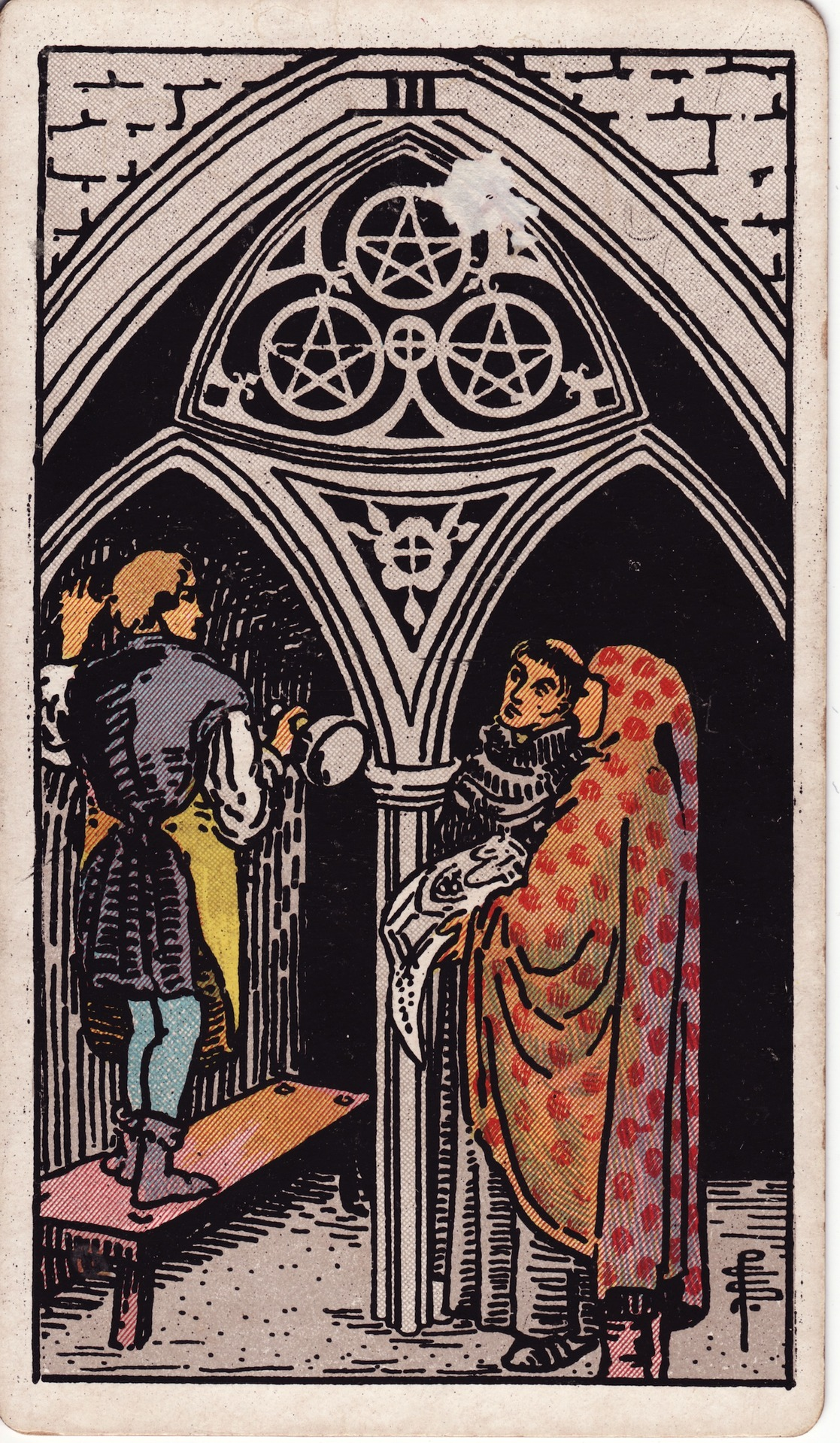
Three of Pentacles

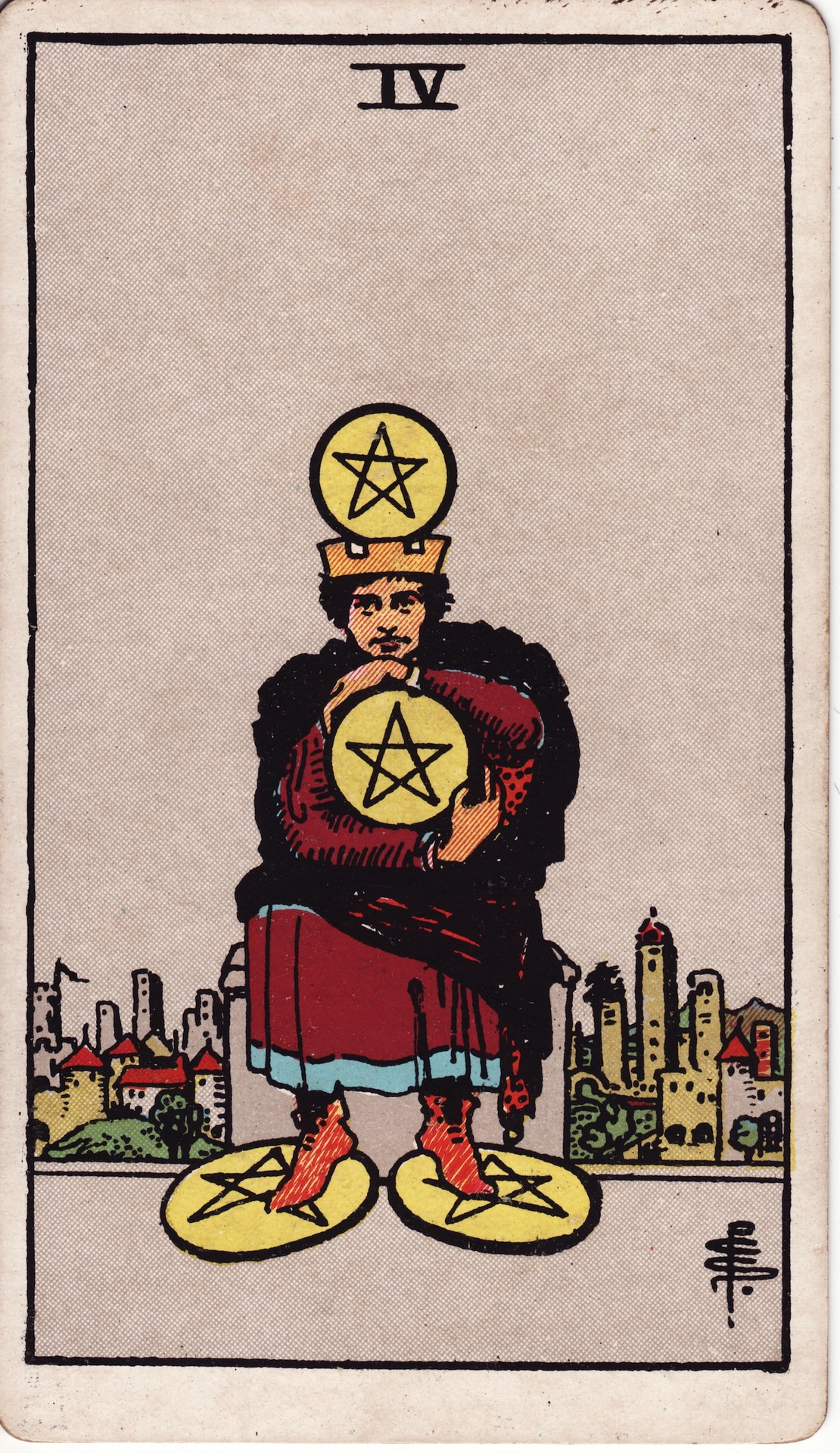
Four of Pentacles

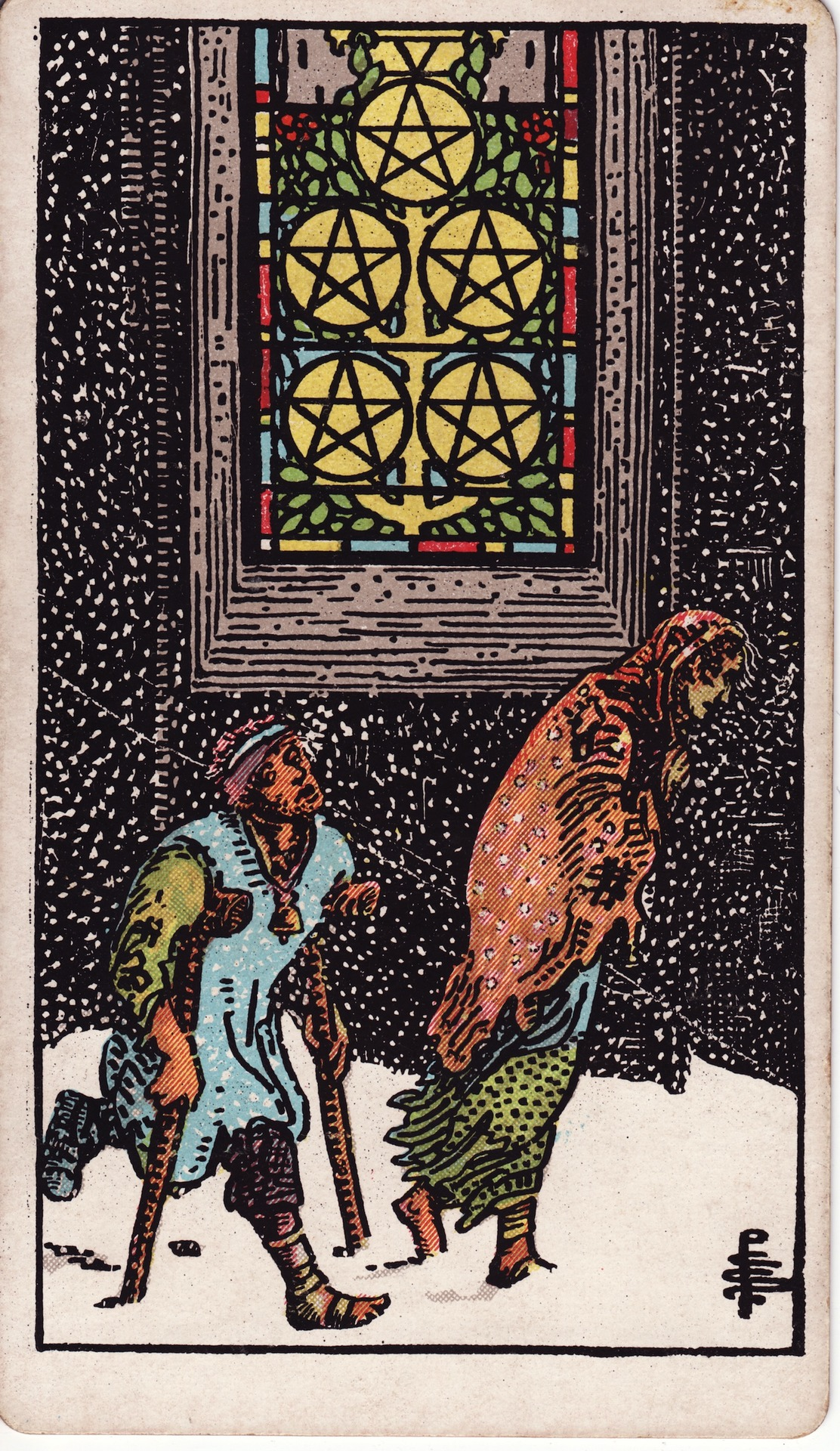
Five of Pentacles

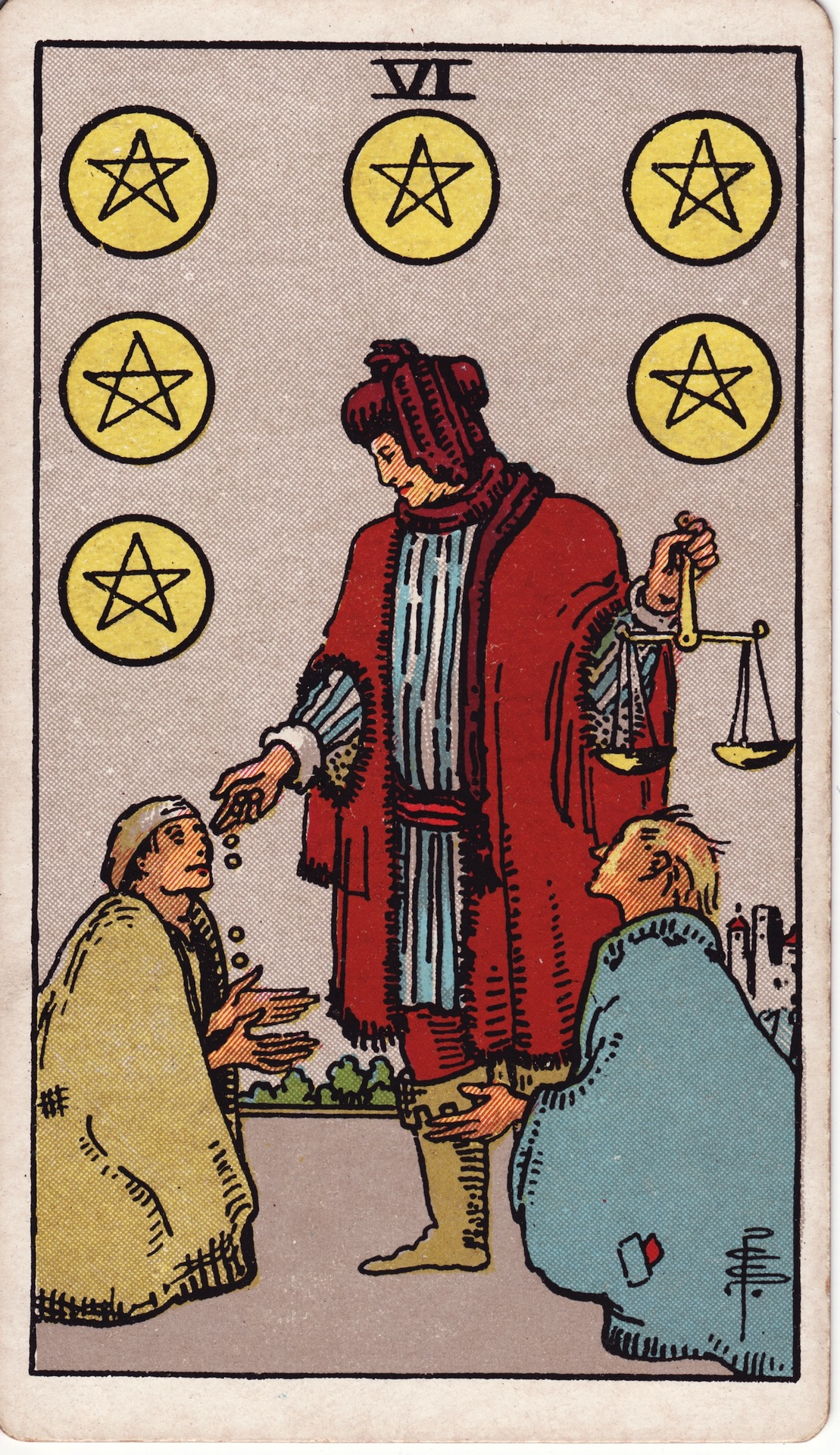
Six of Pentacles

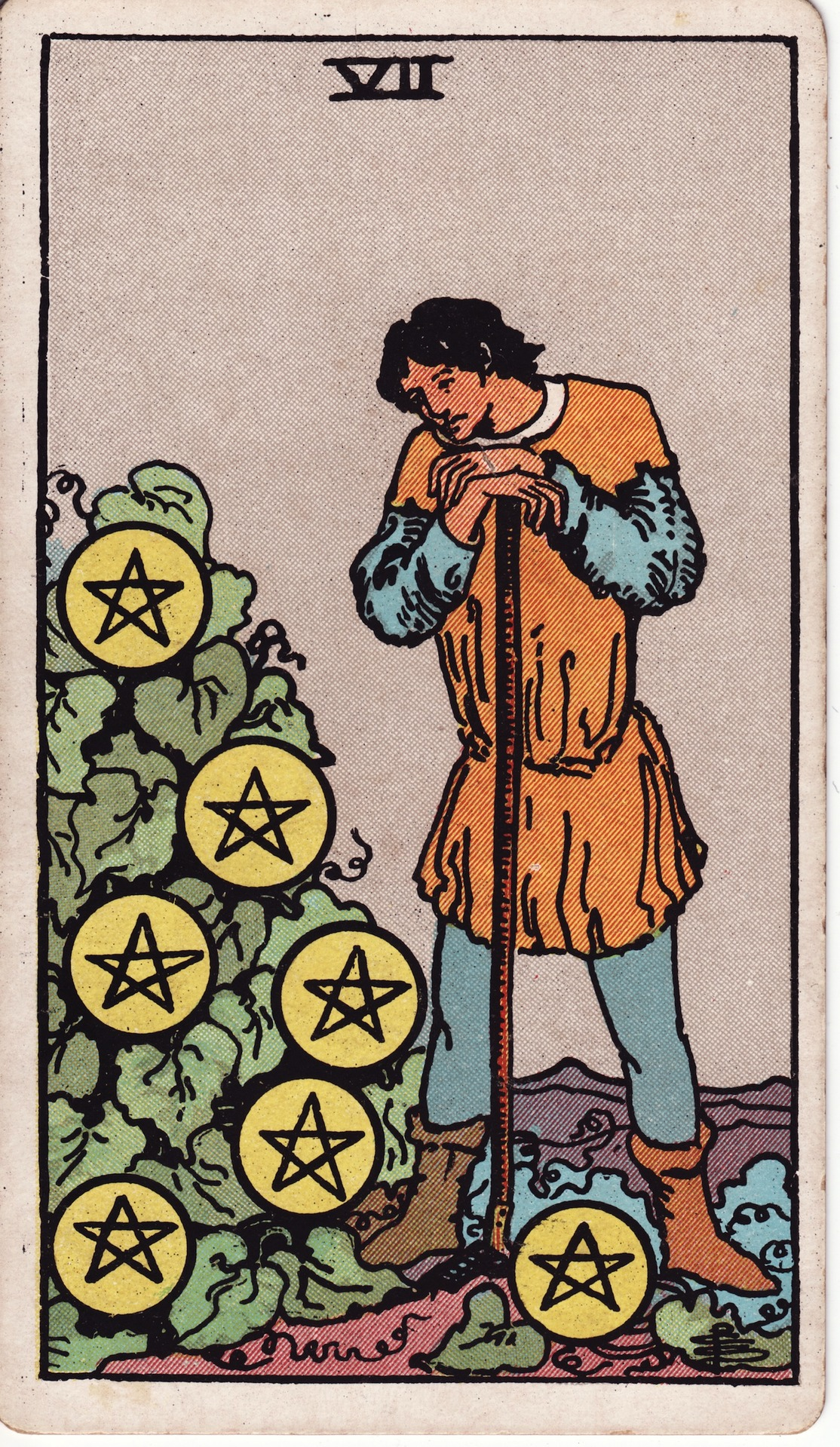
Seven of Pentacles

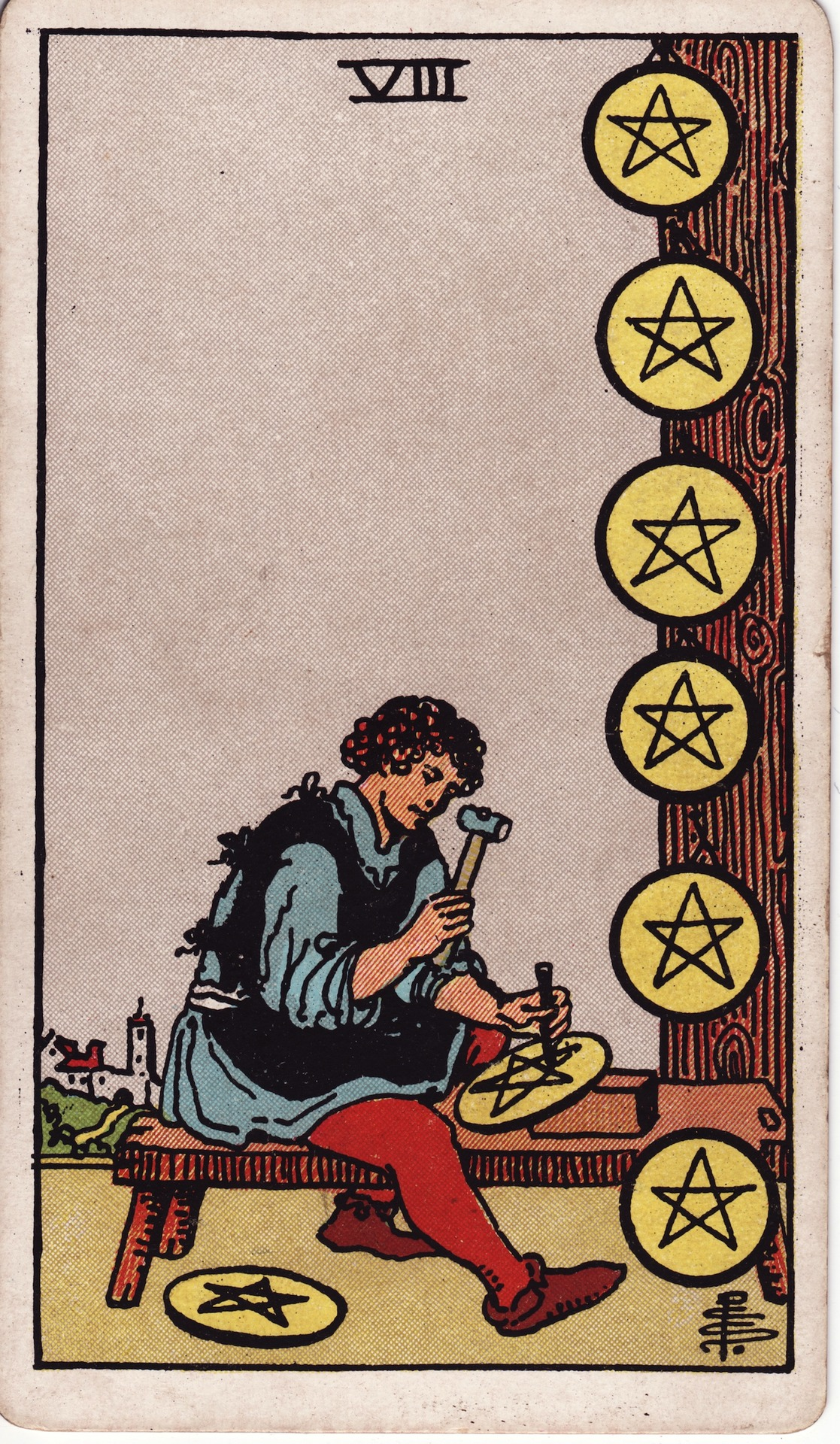
Eight of Pentacles

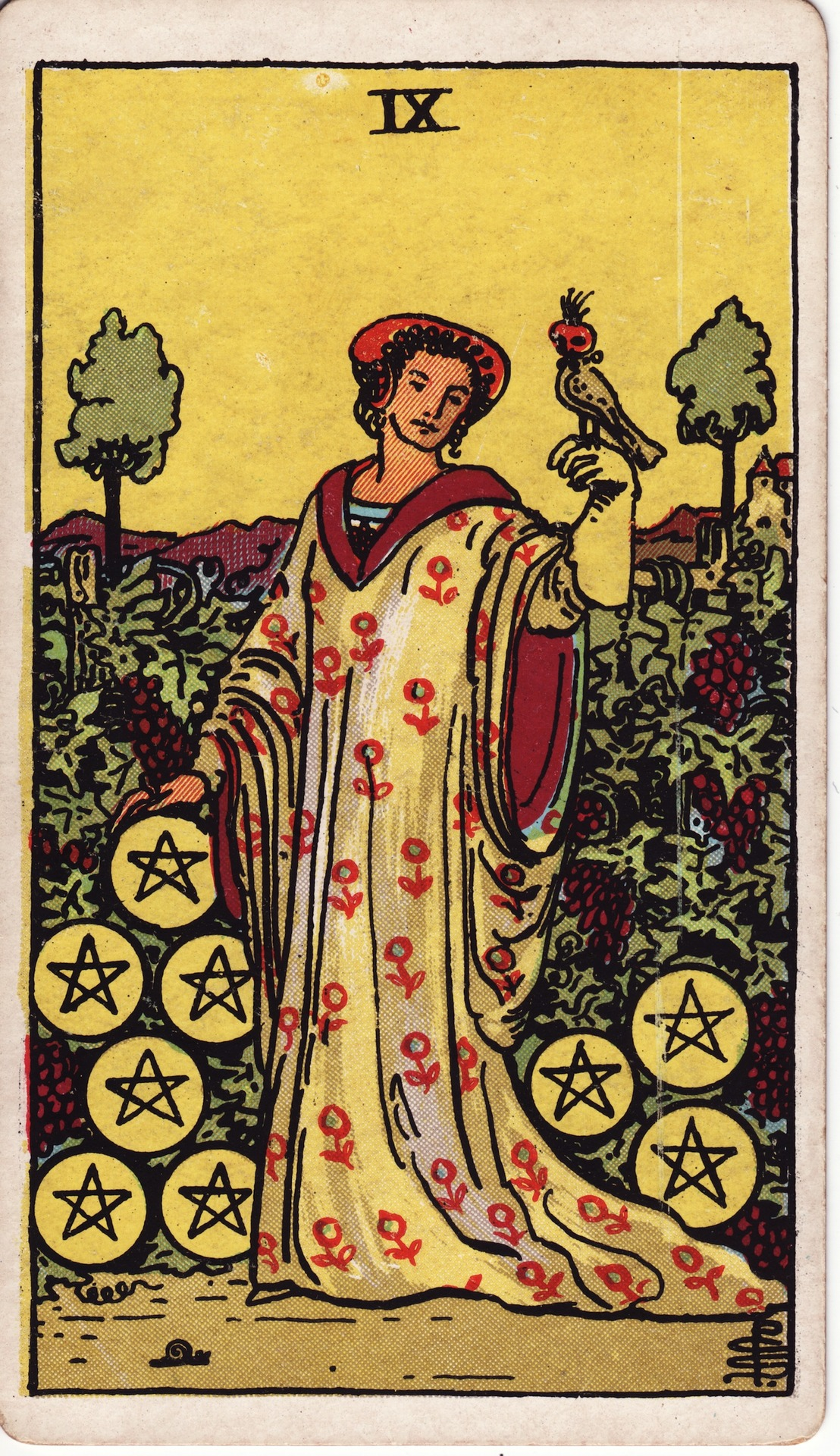
Nine of Pentacles

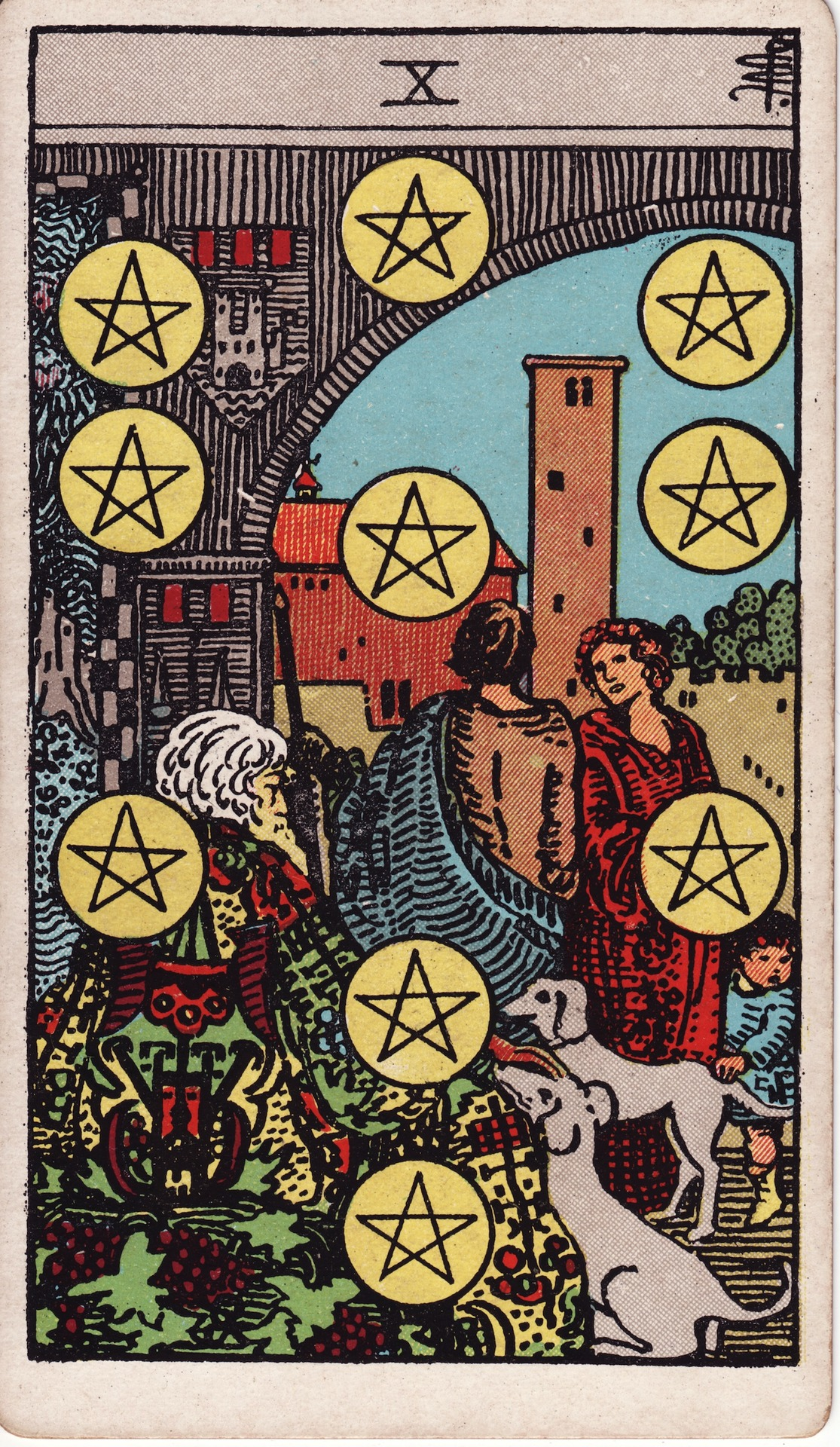
Ten of Pentacles
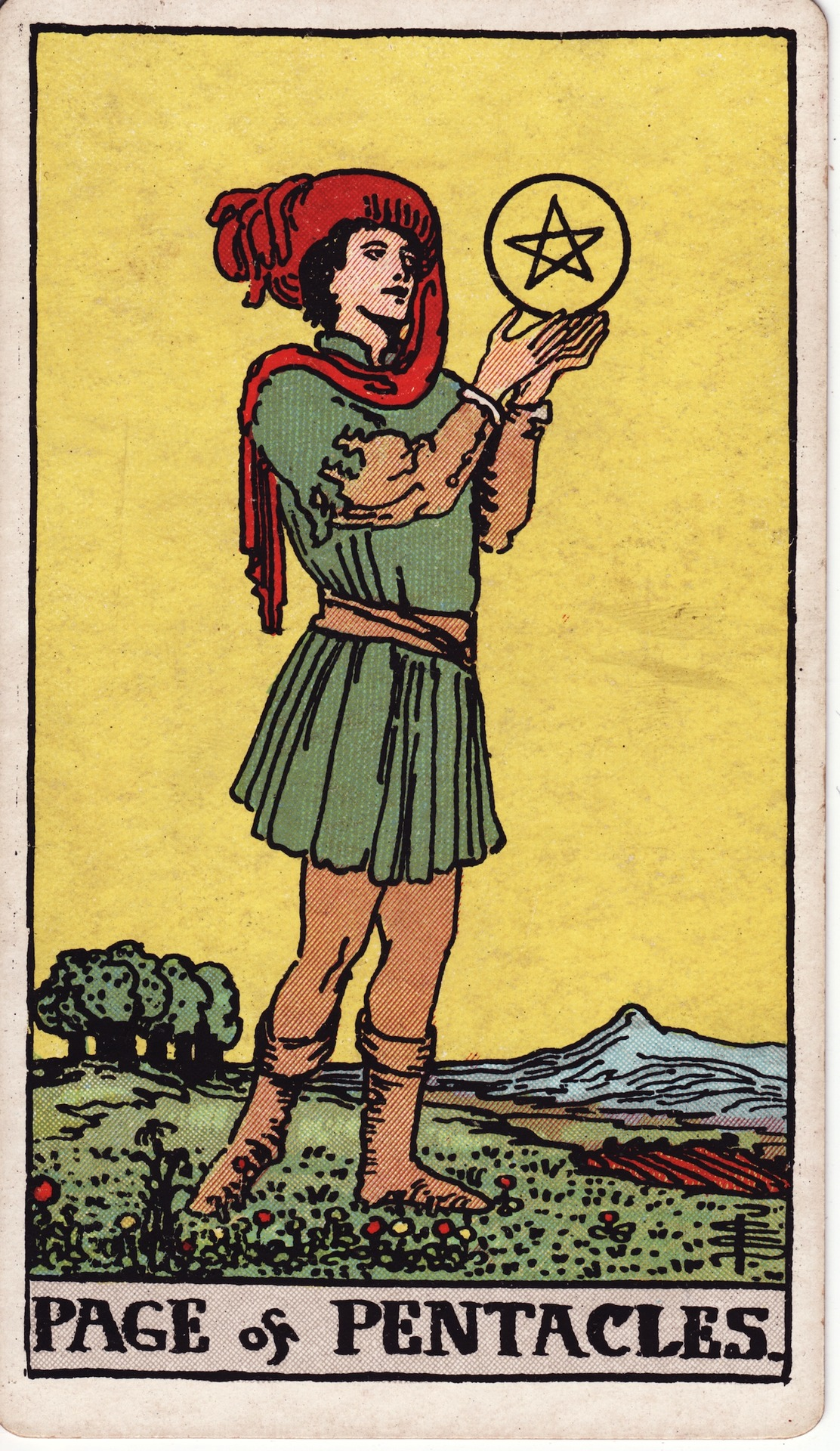
Page of Pentacles

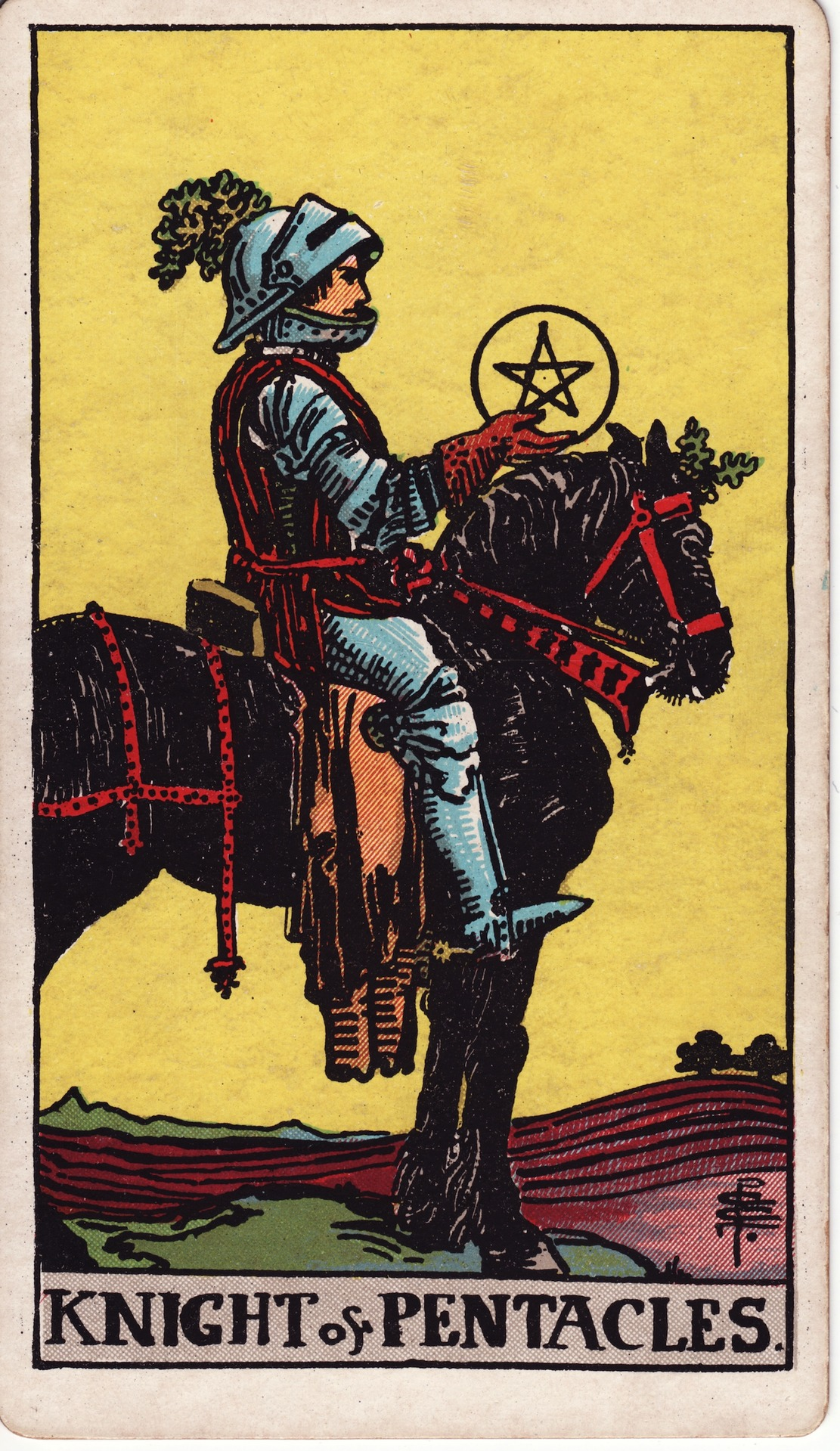
Knight of Pentacles

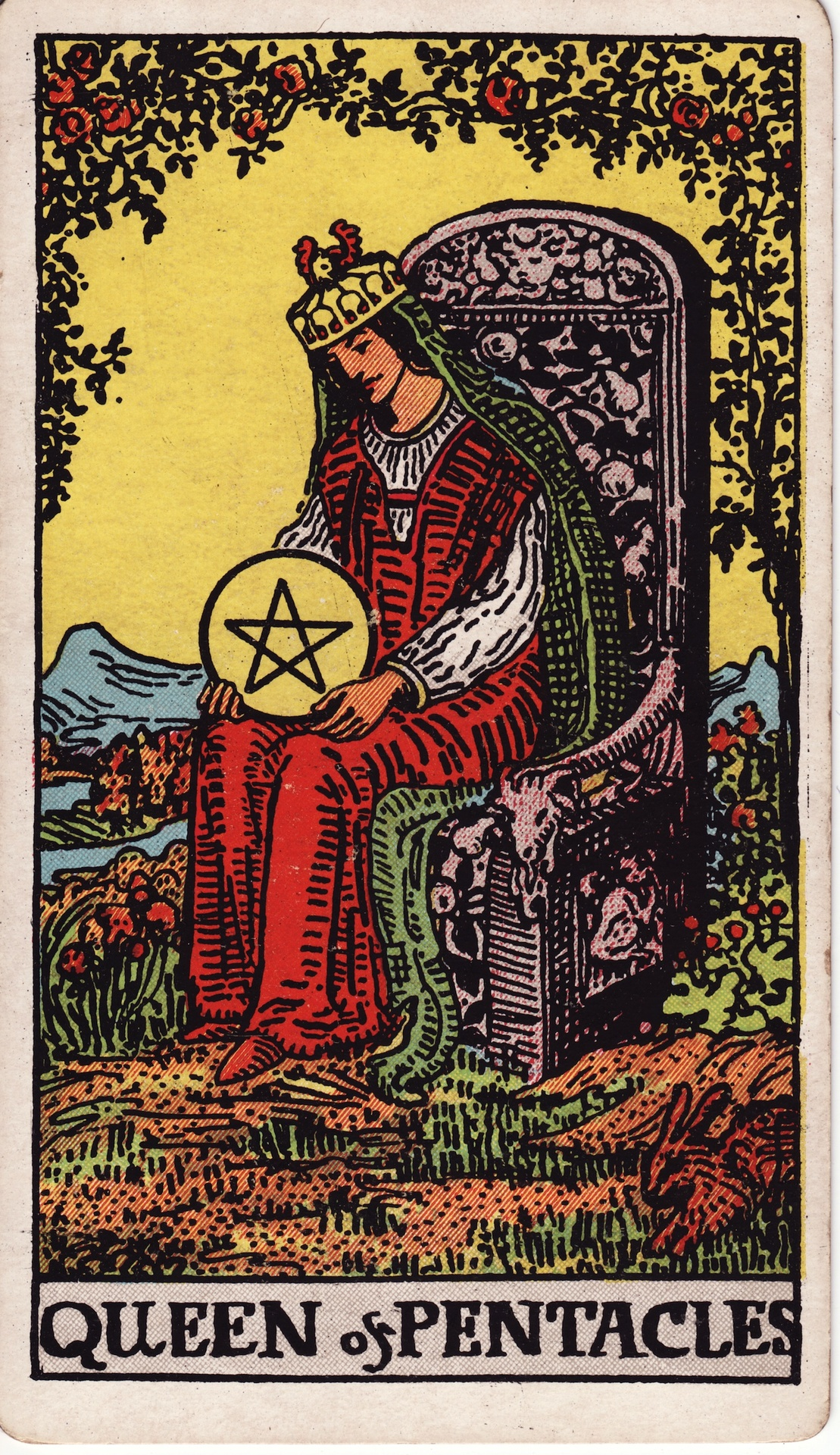
Queen of Pentacles

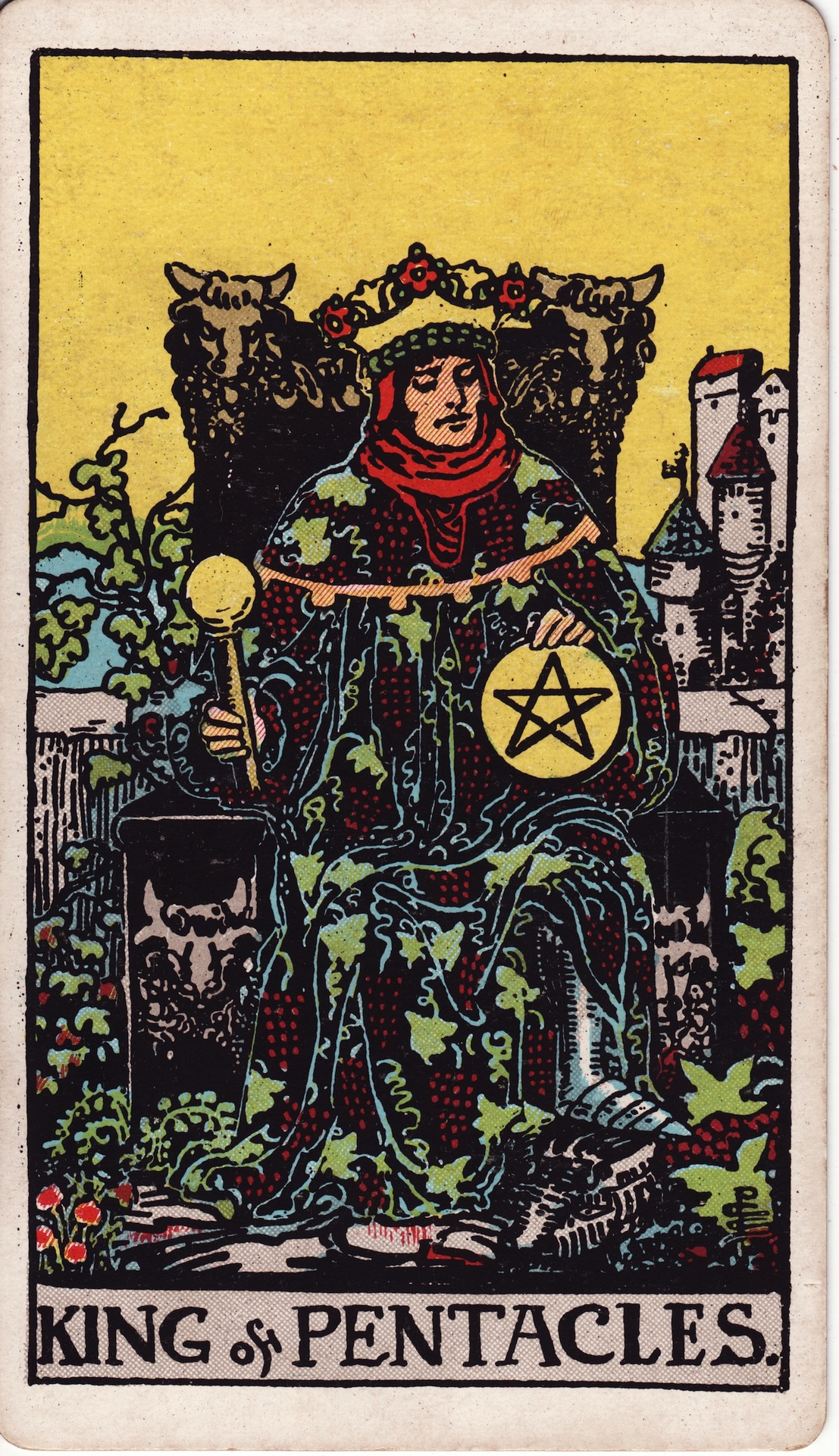
King of Pentacles

=== Wands ===
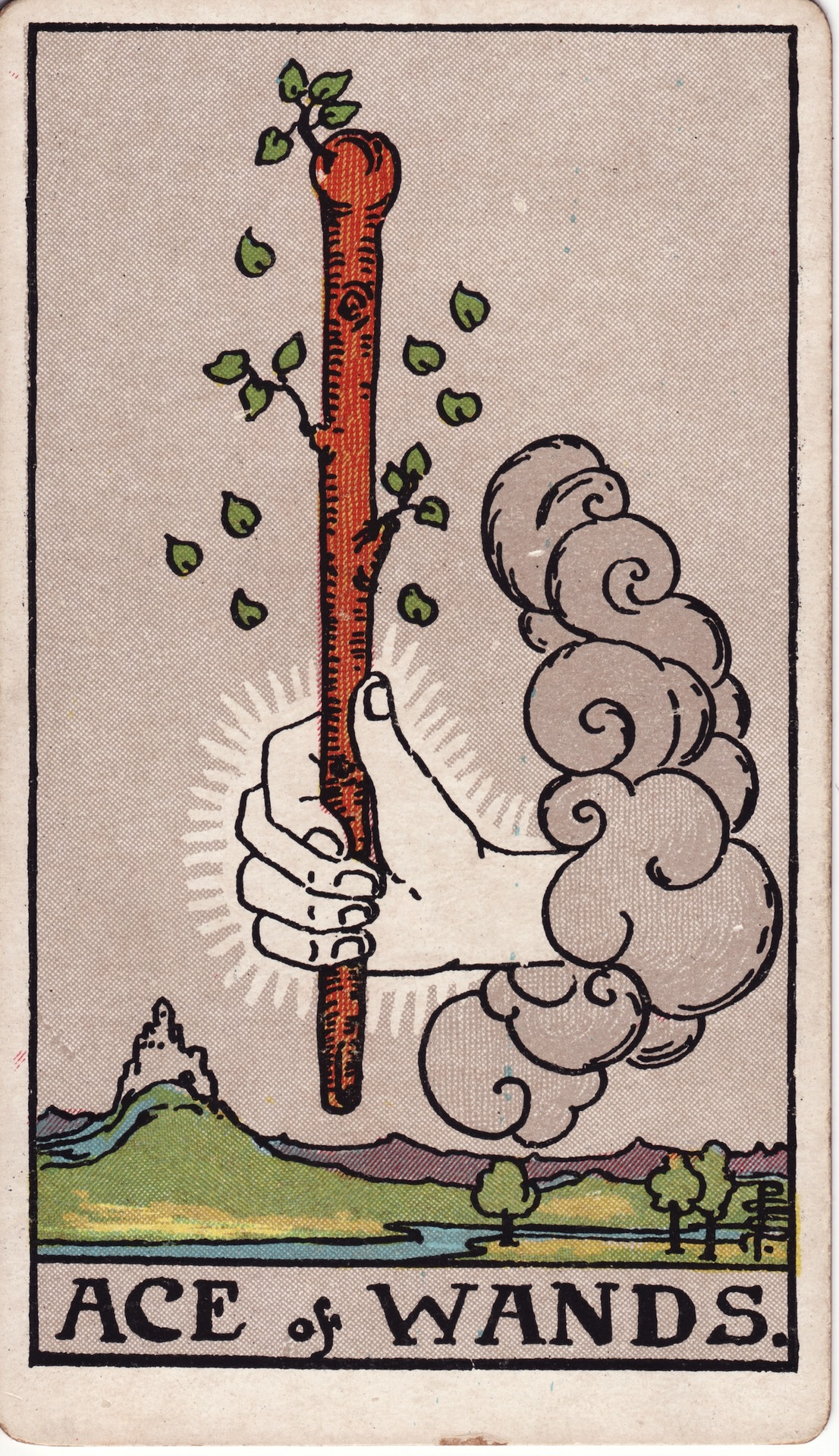
Ace of Wands

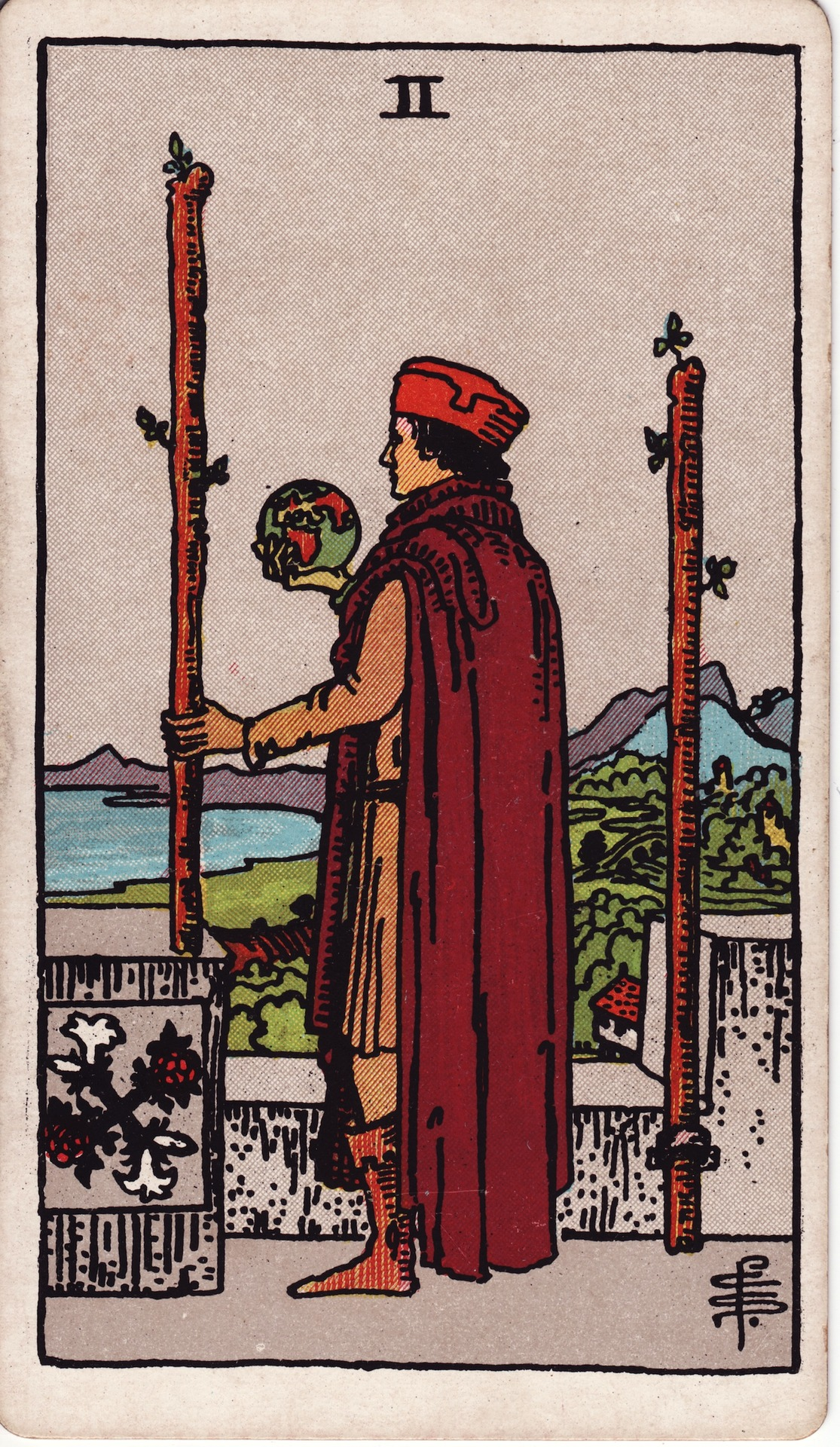
Two of Wands

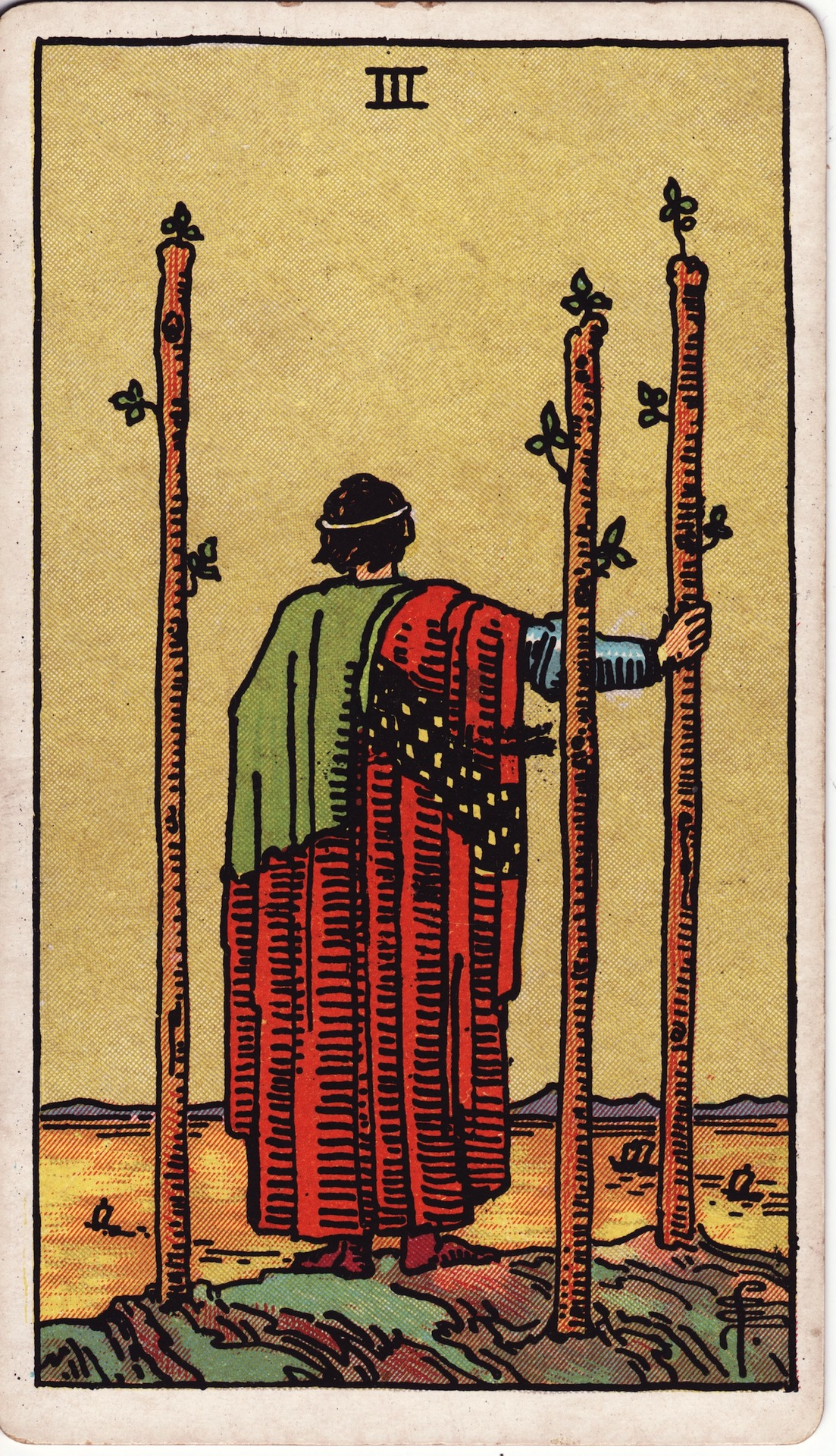
Three of Wands

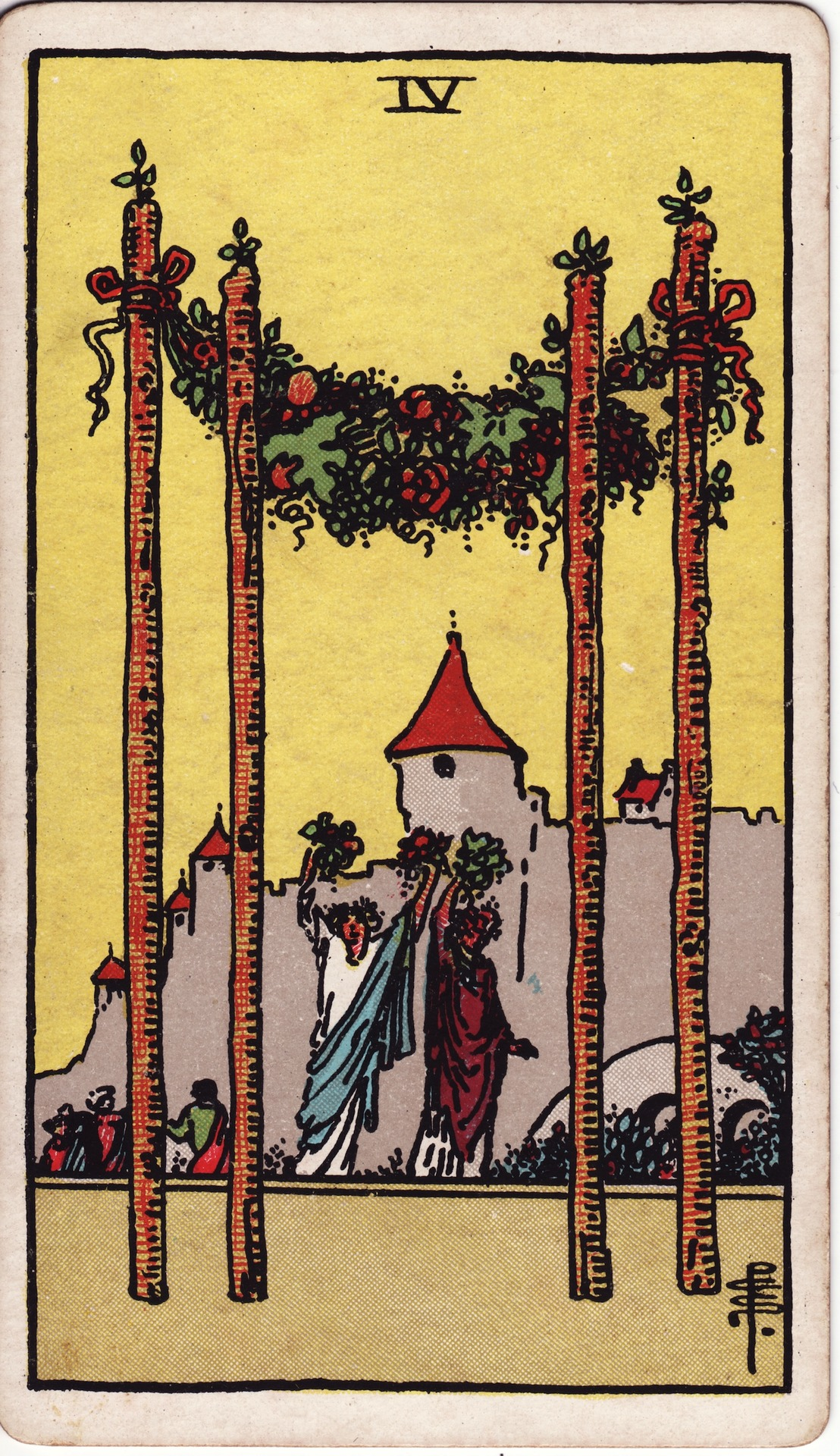
Four of Wands

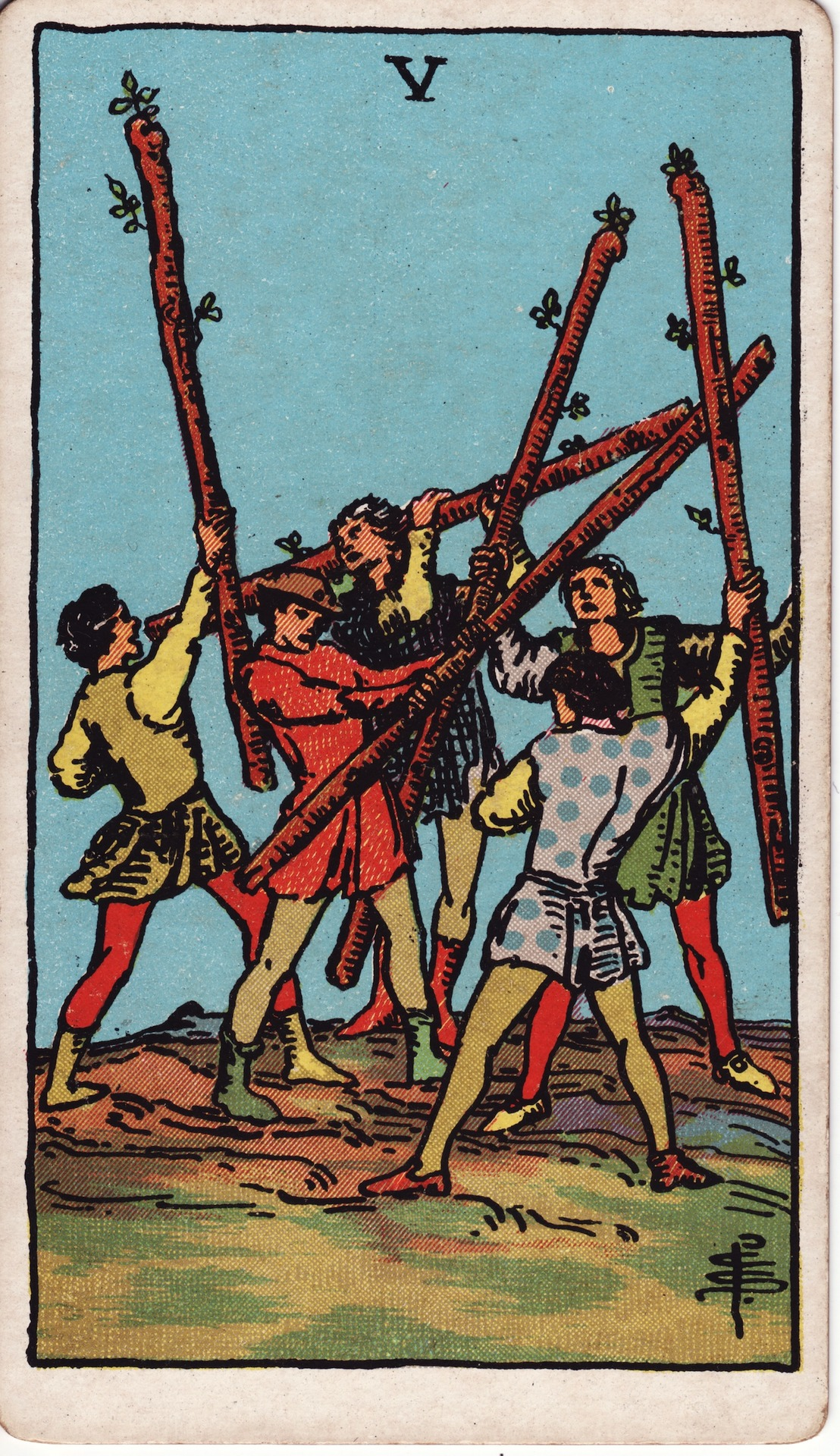
Five of Wands

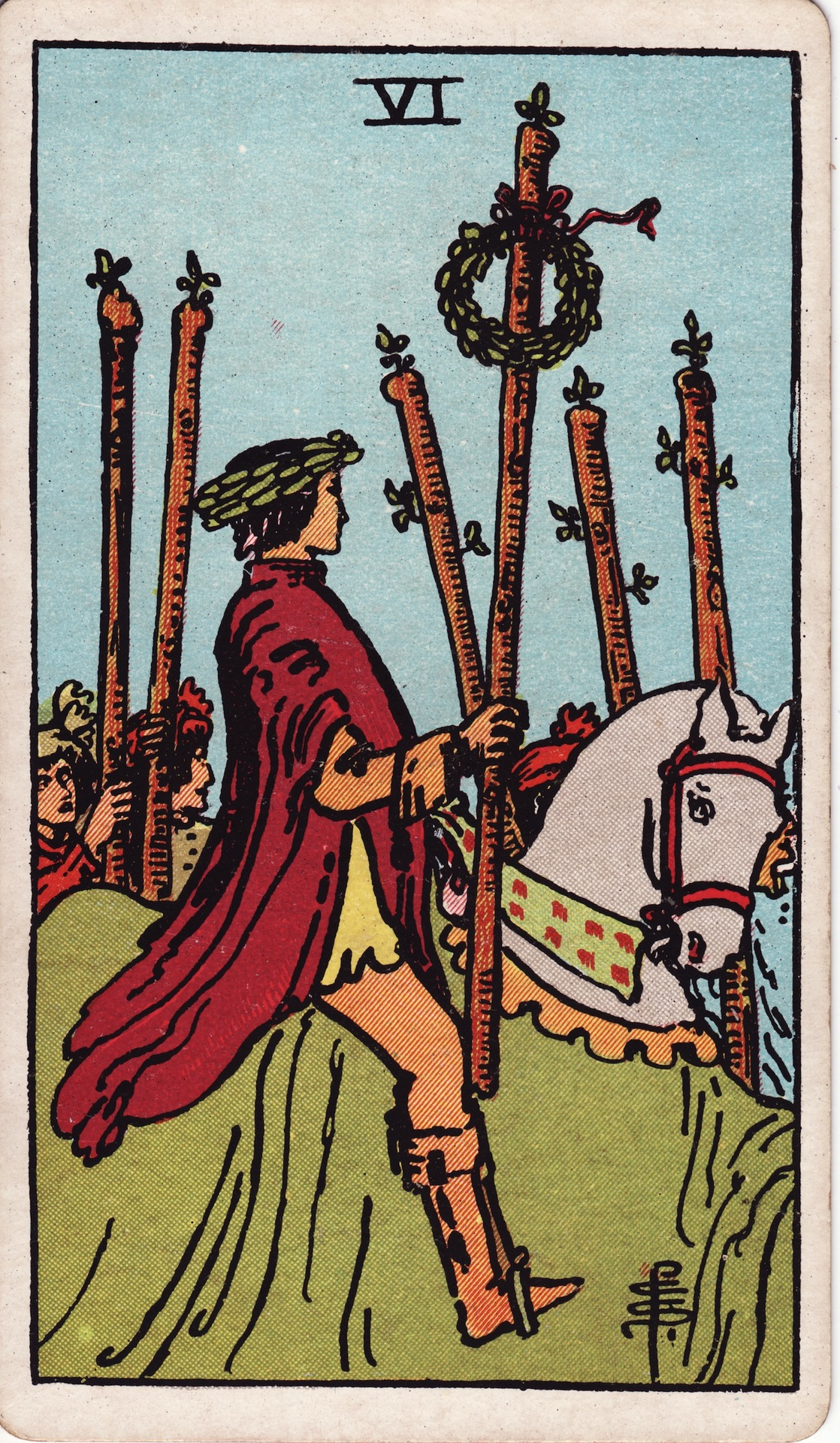
Six of Wands

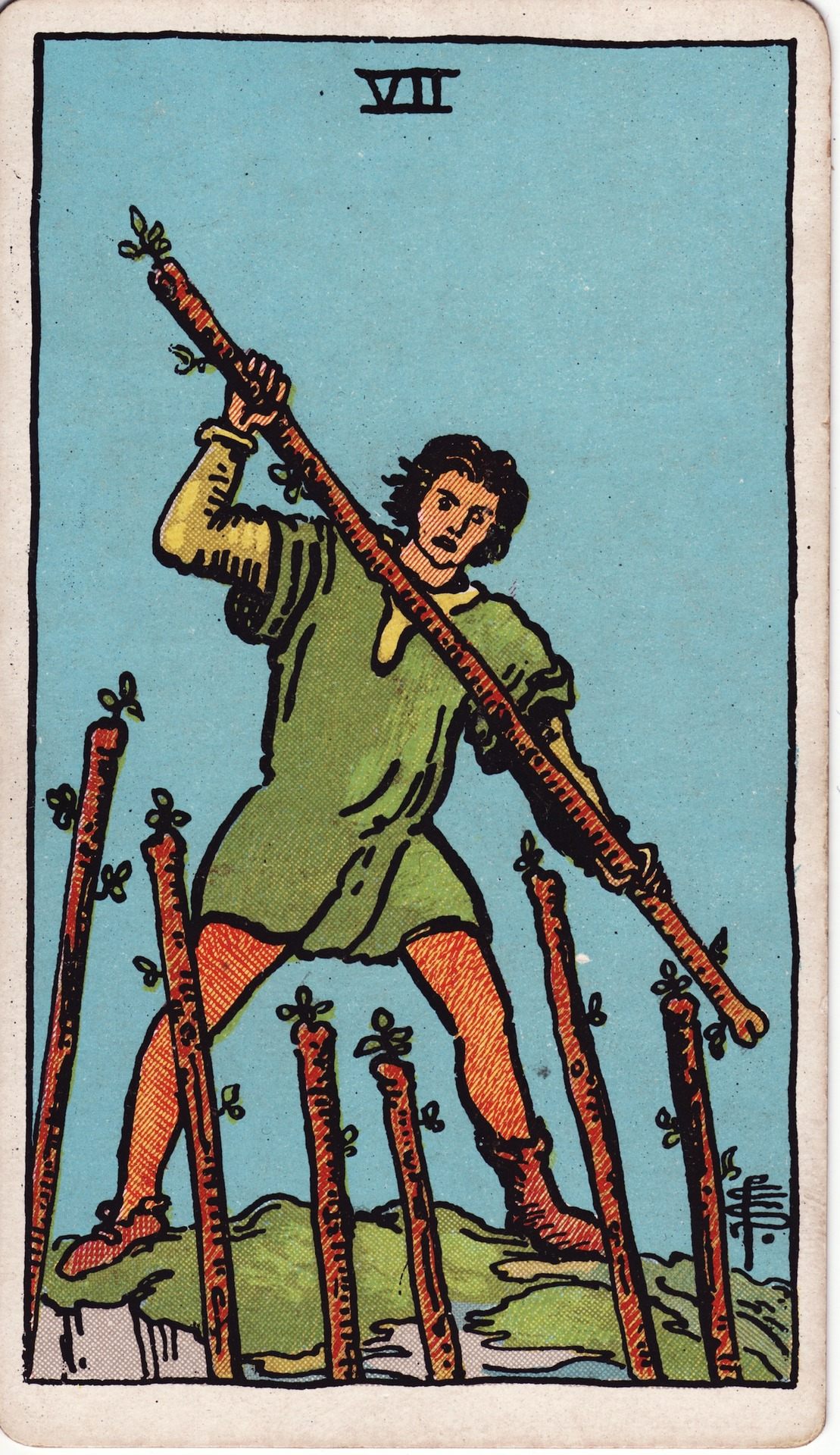
Seven of Wands

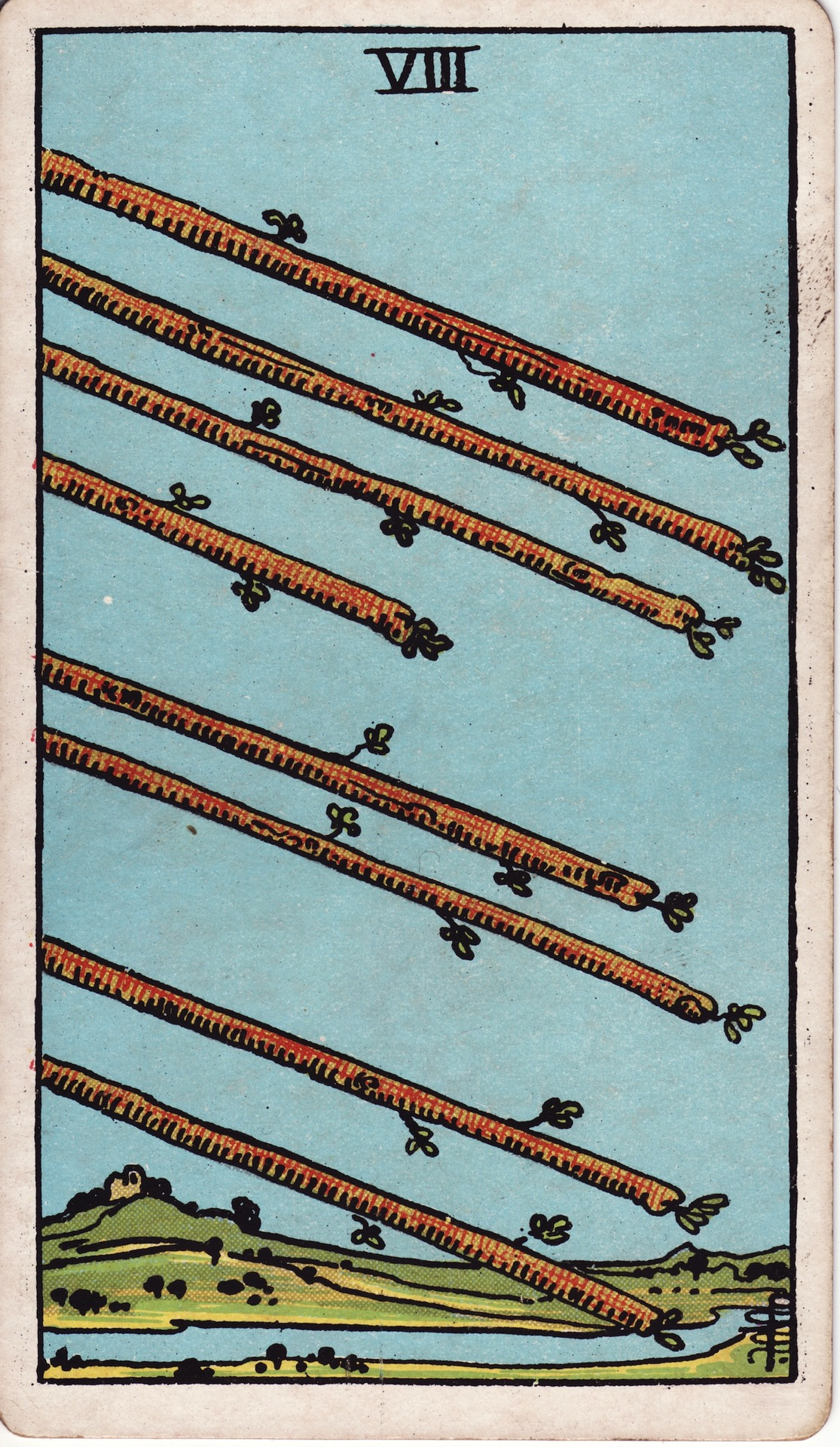
Eight of Wands

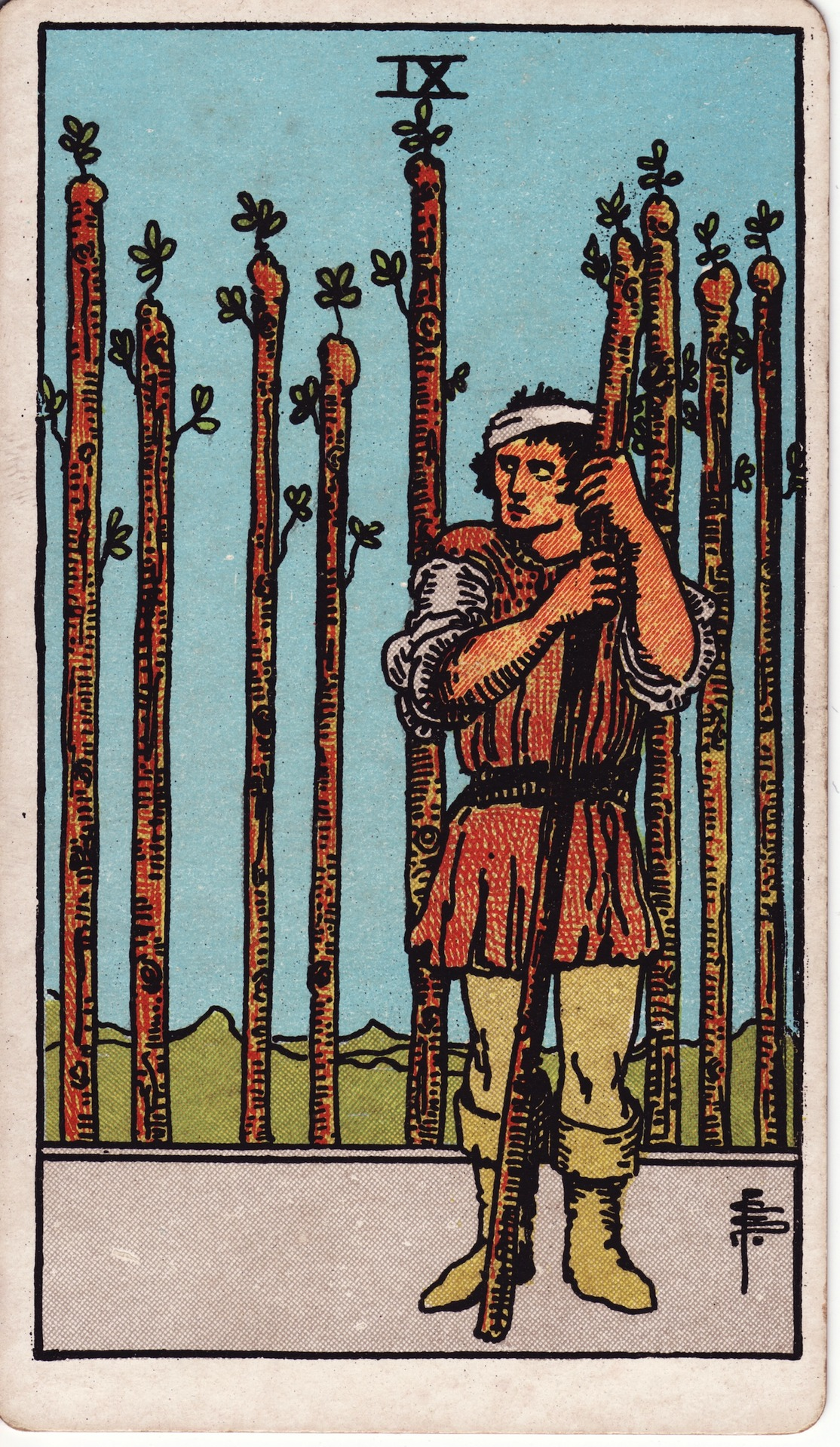
Nine of Wands

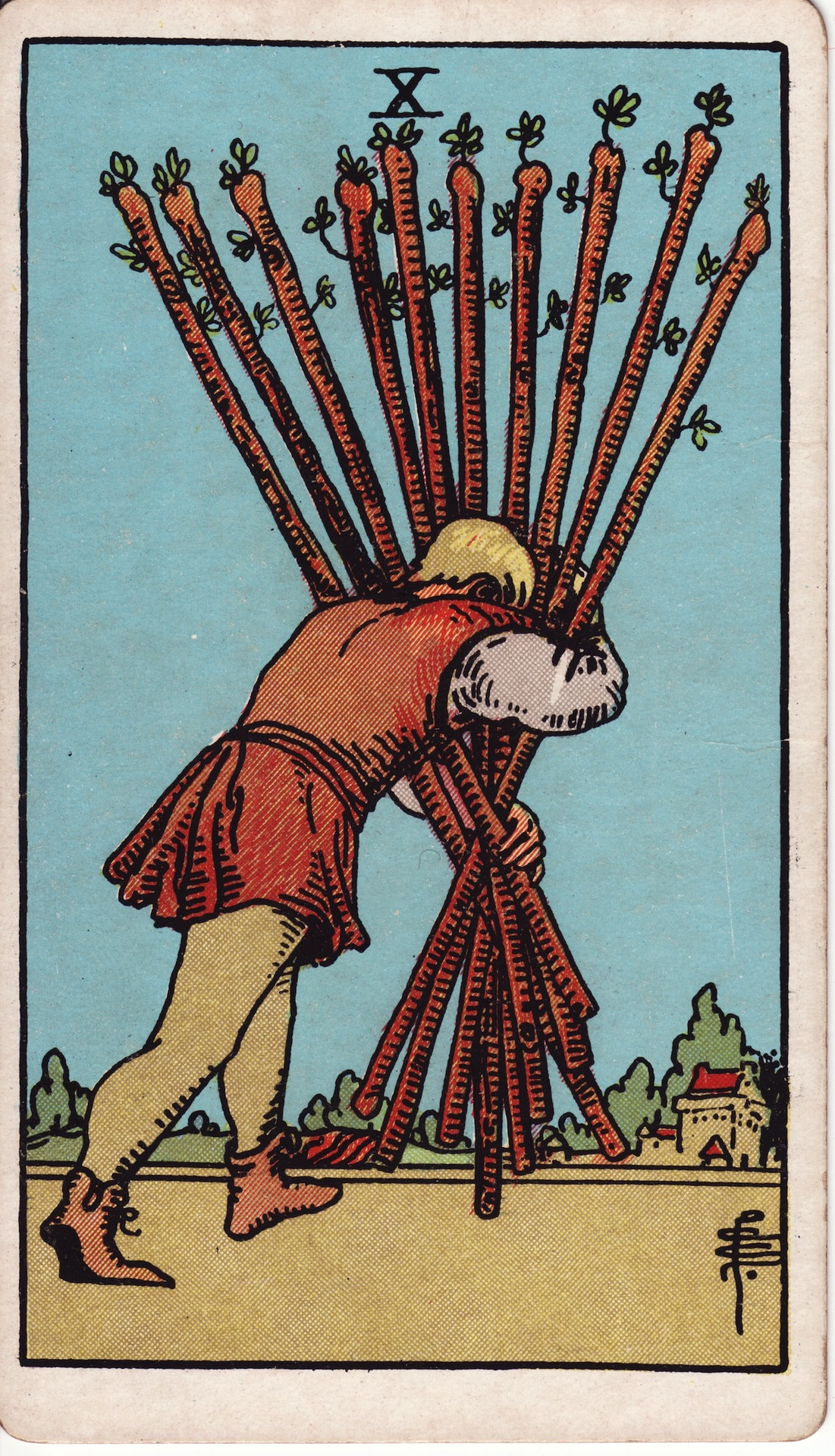
Ten of Wands
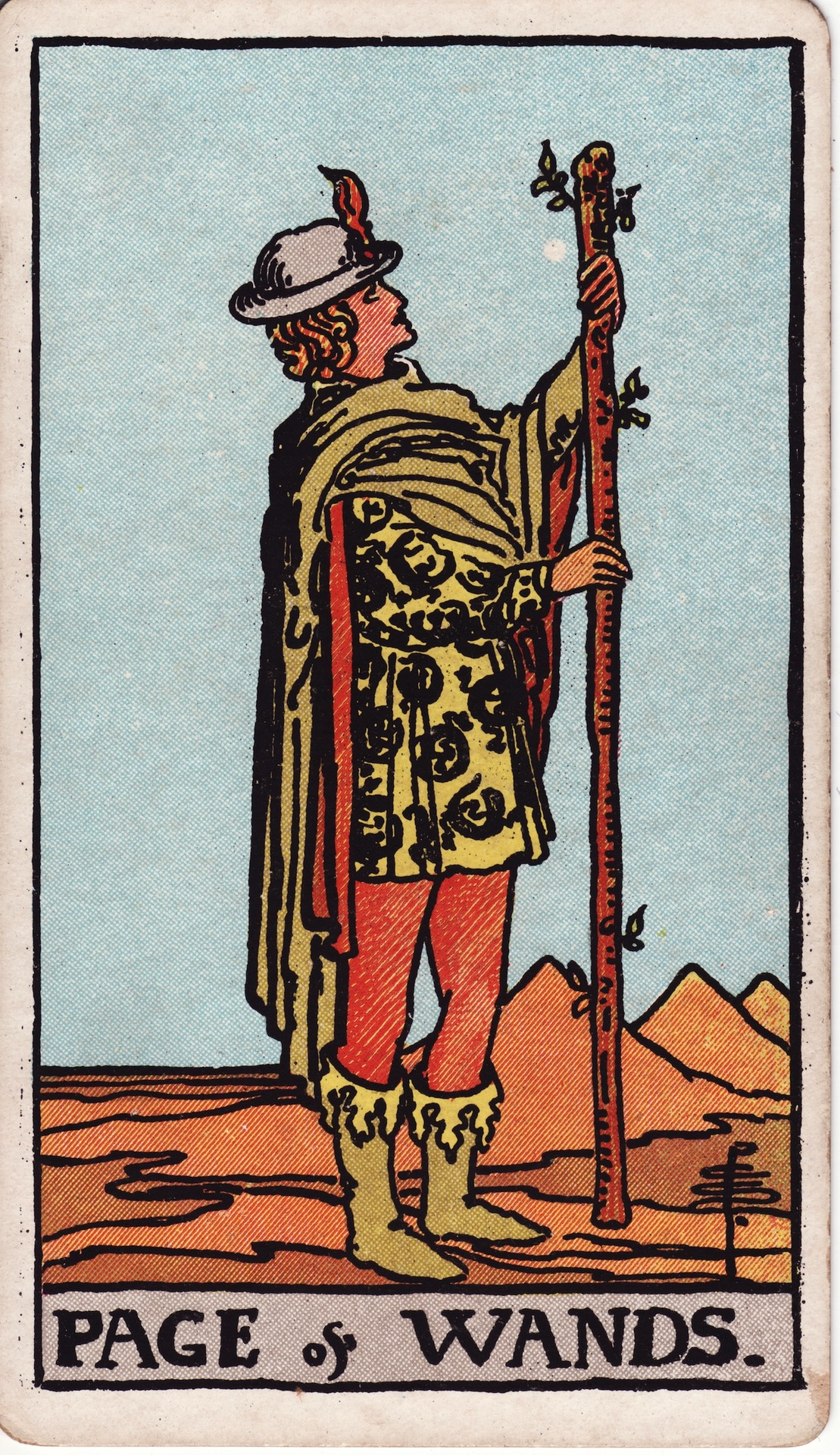
Page of Wands

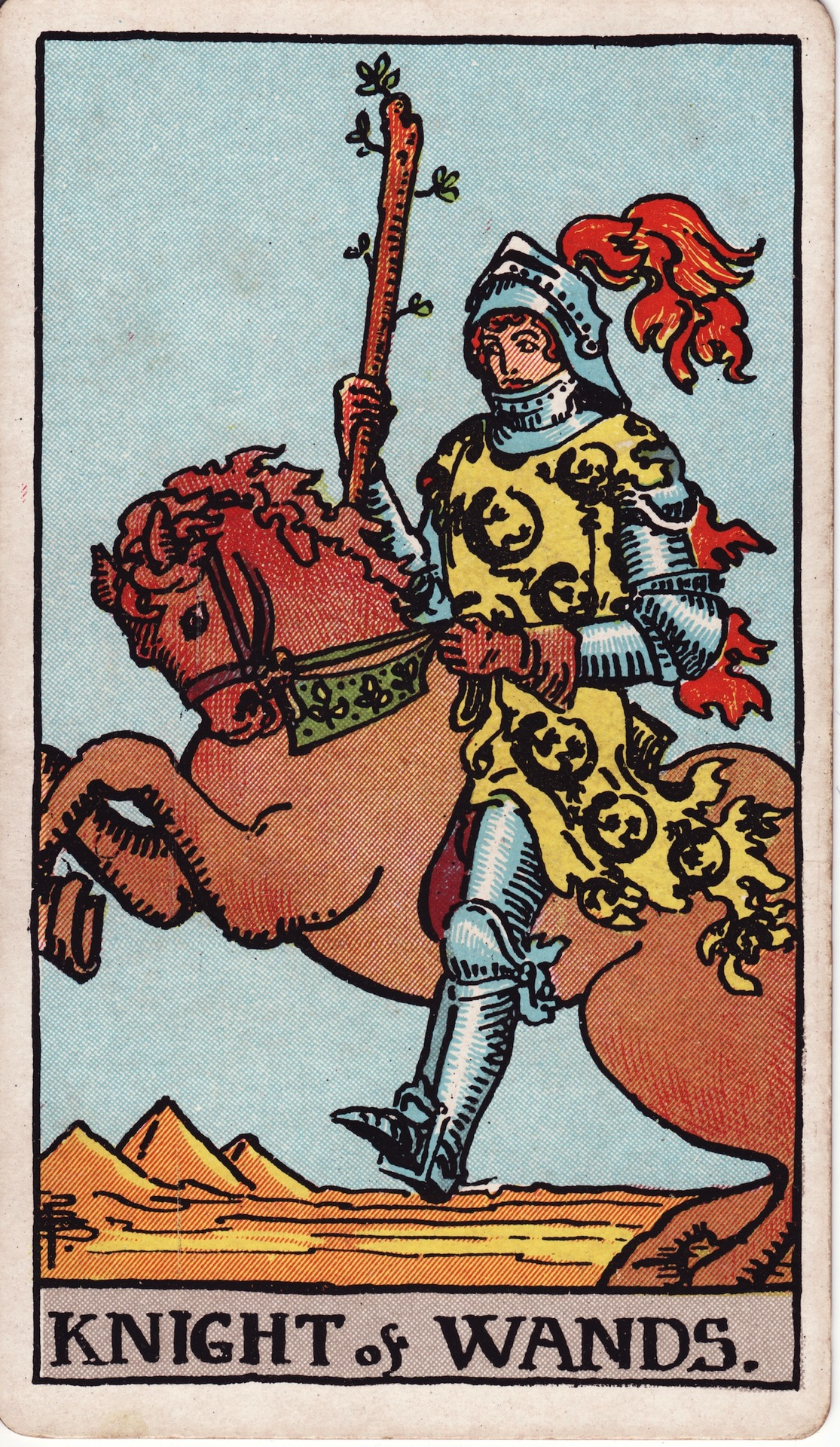
Knight of Wands

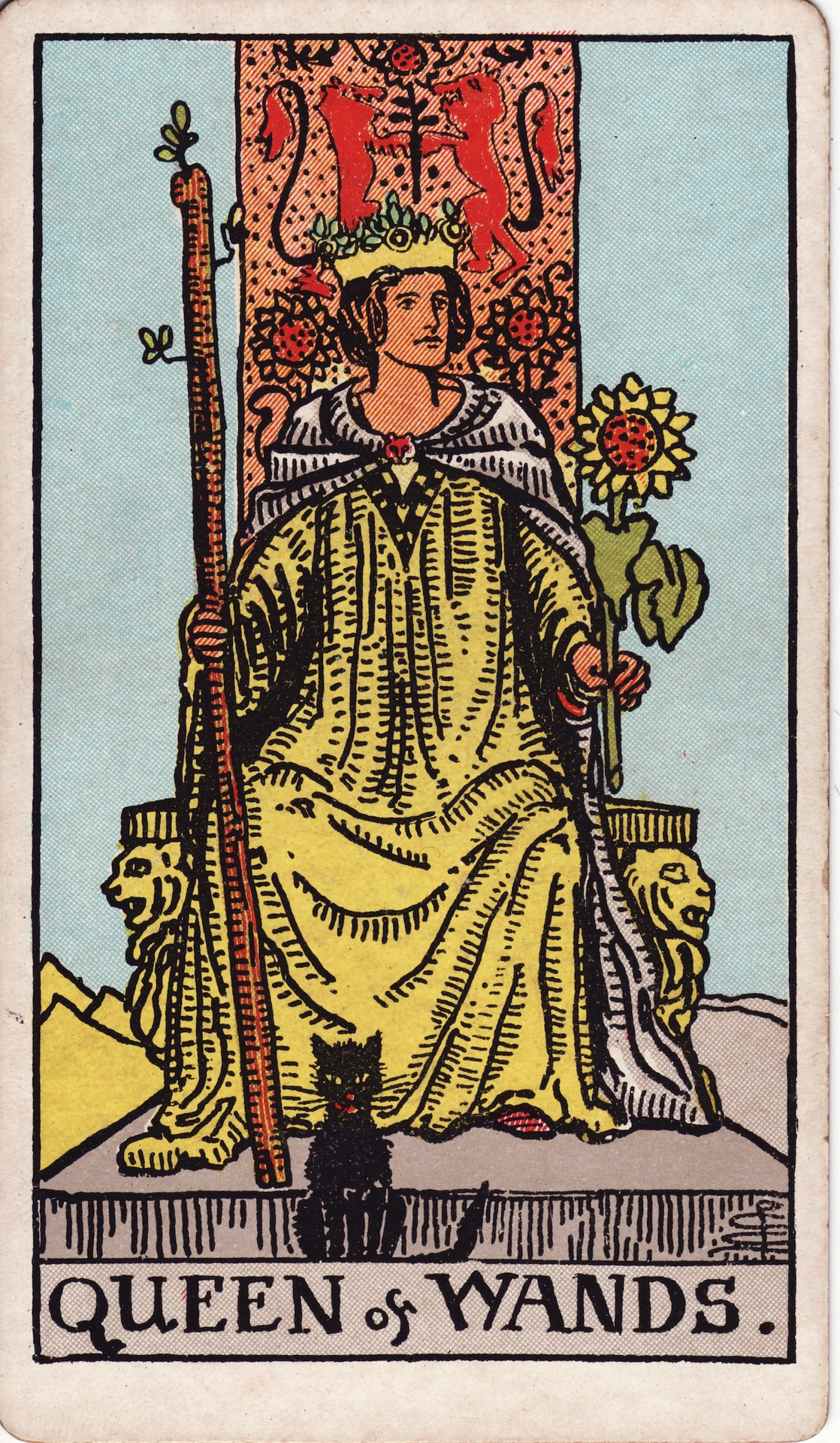
Queen of Wands

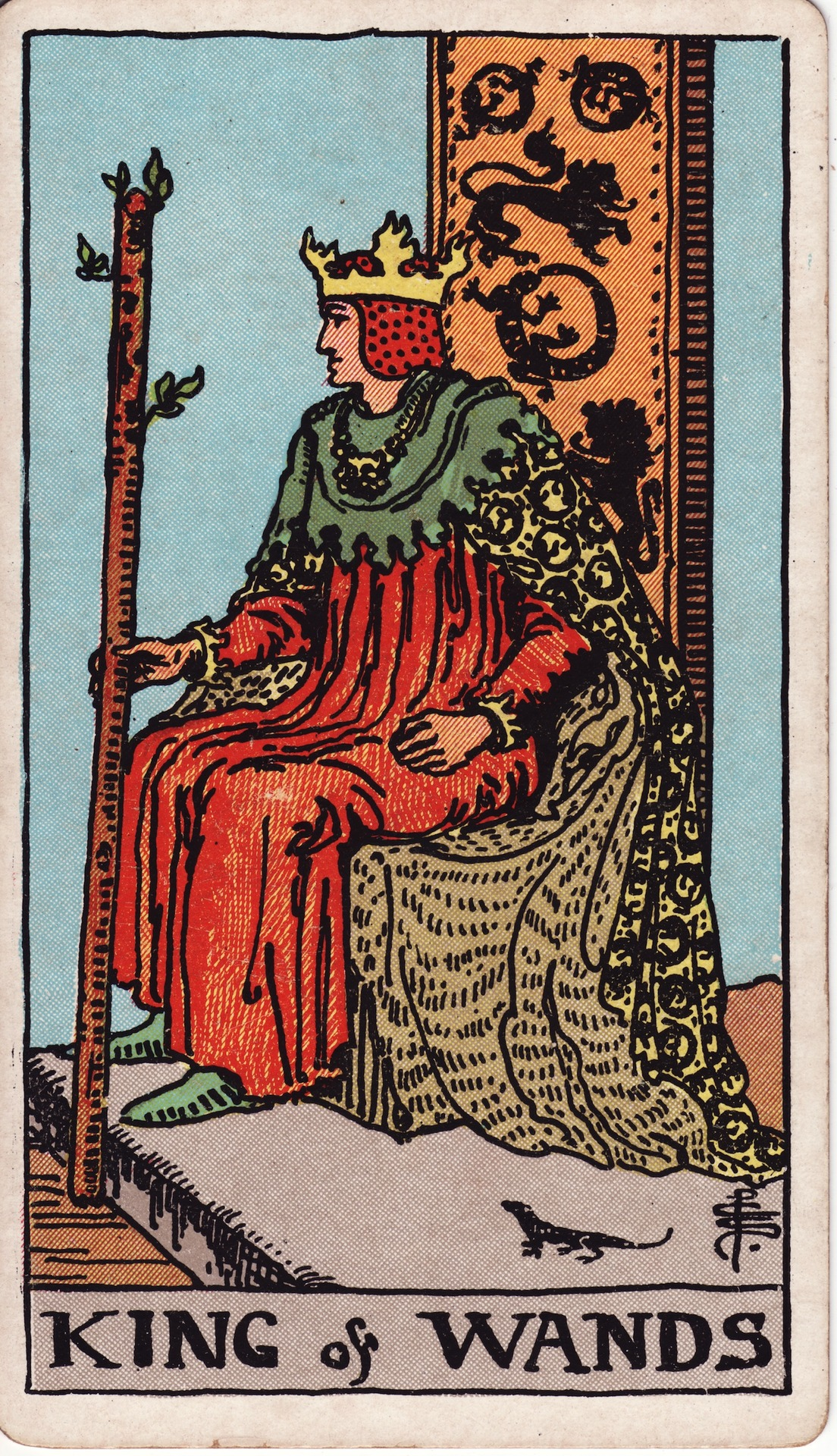
King of Wands

=== Swords ===
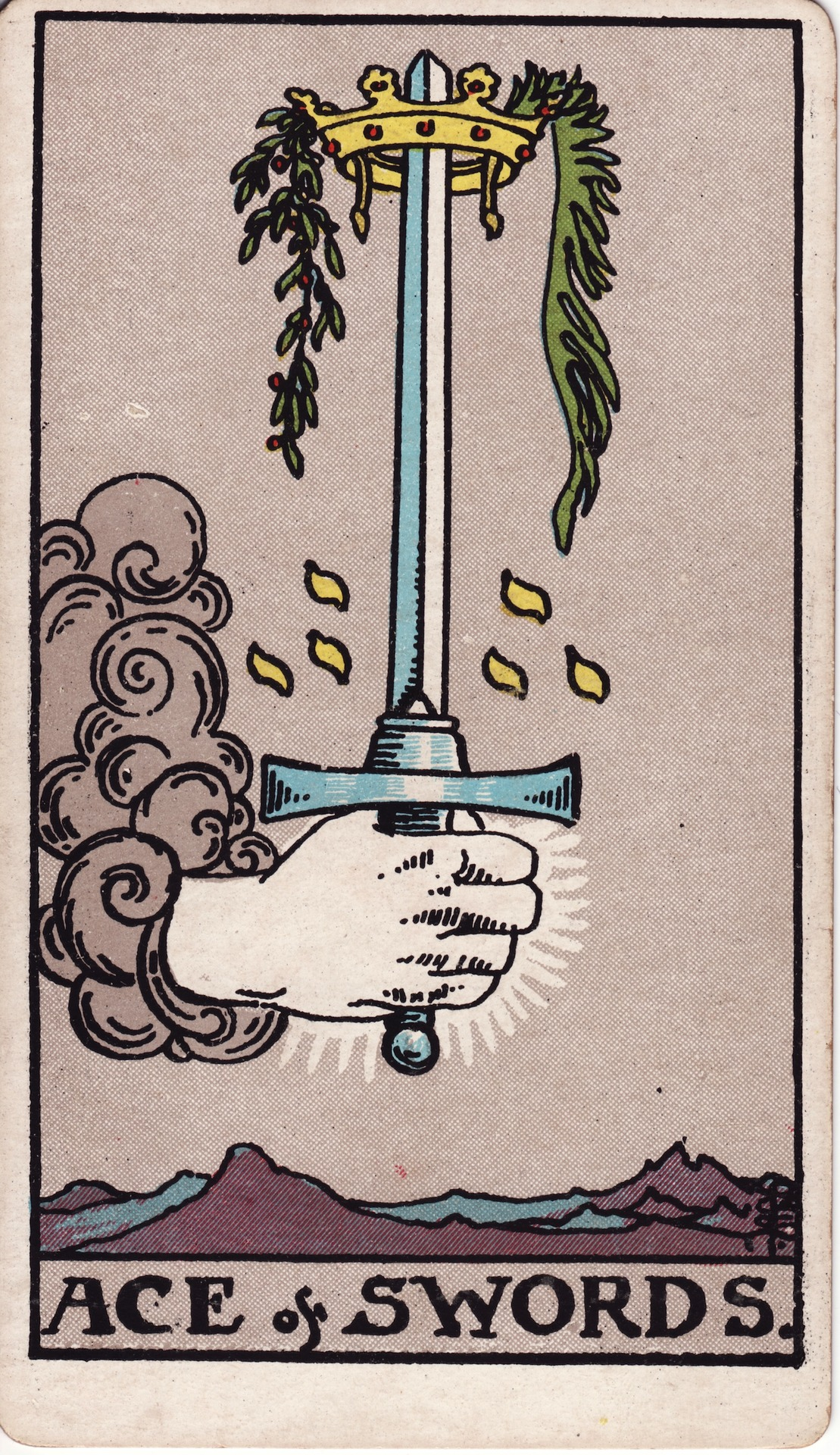
Ace of Swords

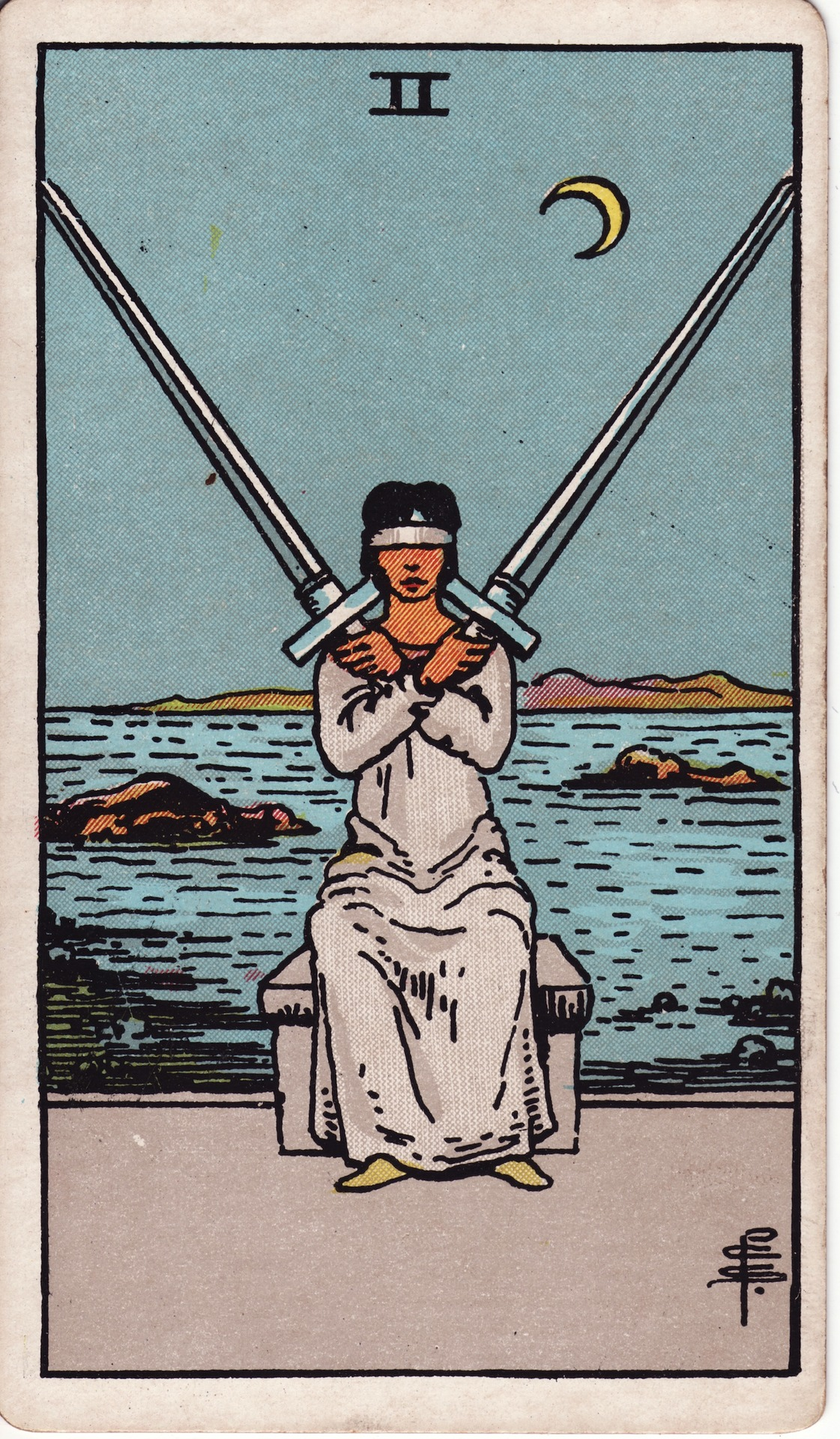
Two of Swords

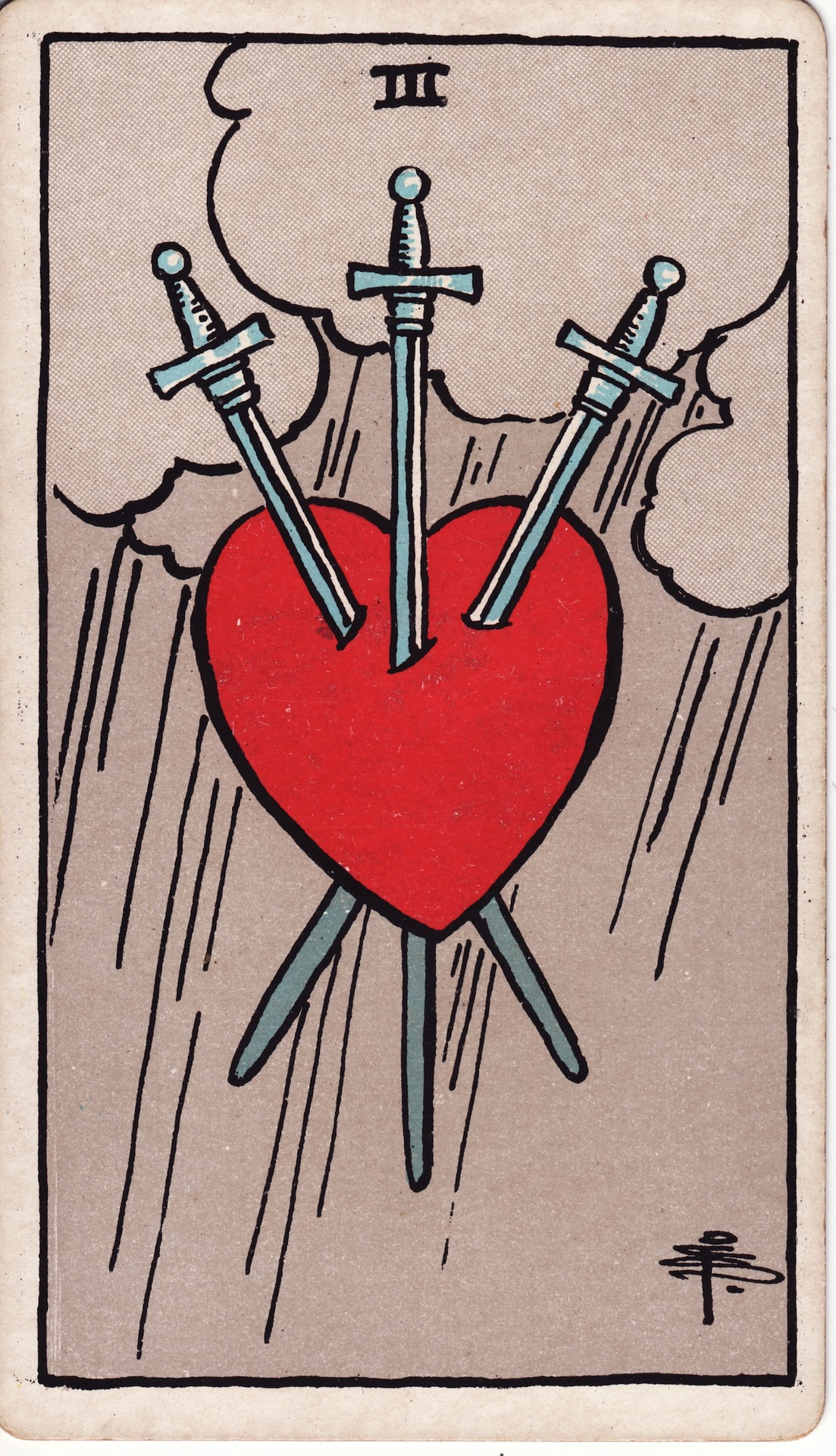
Three of Swords

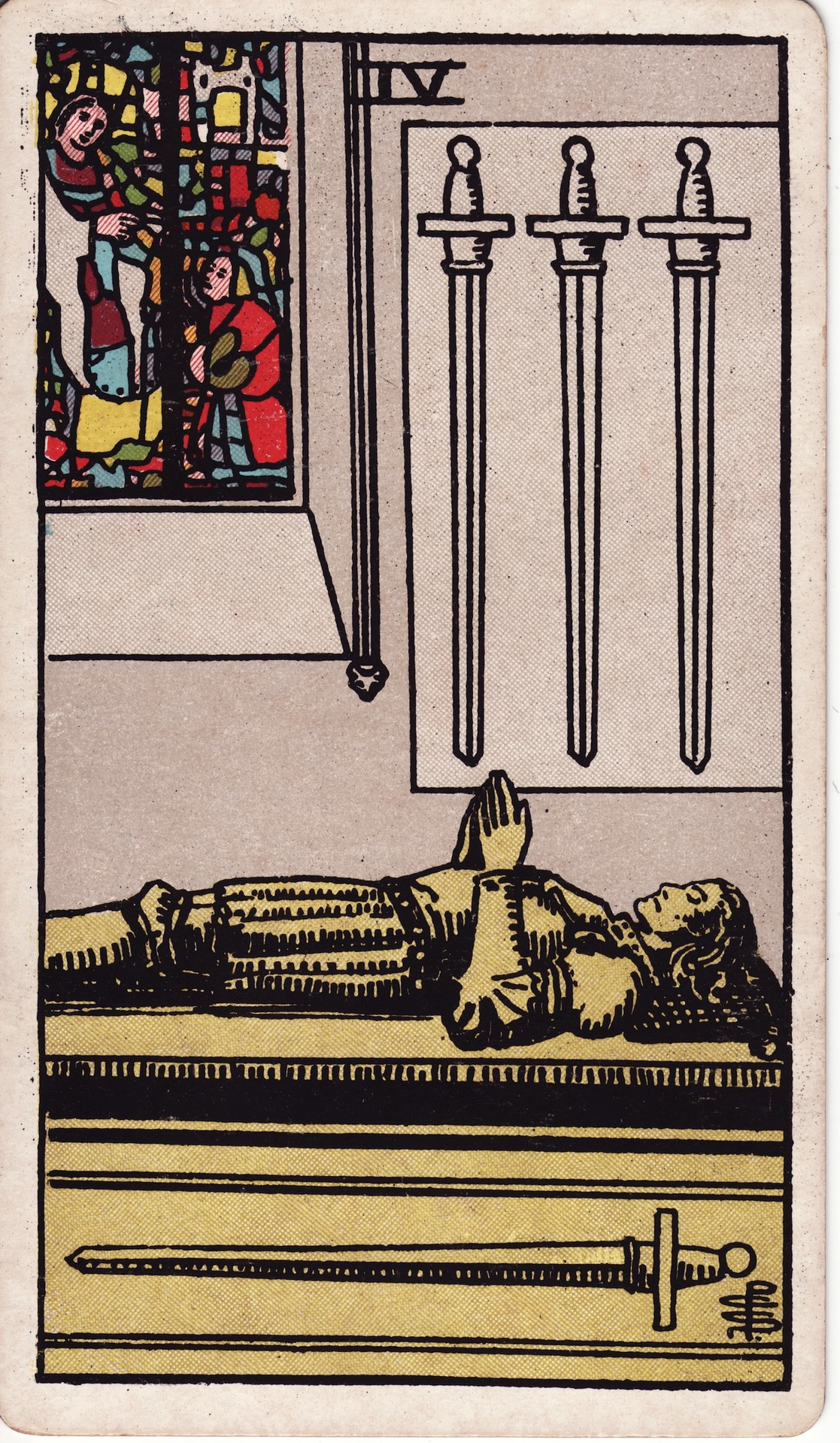
Four of Swords

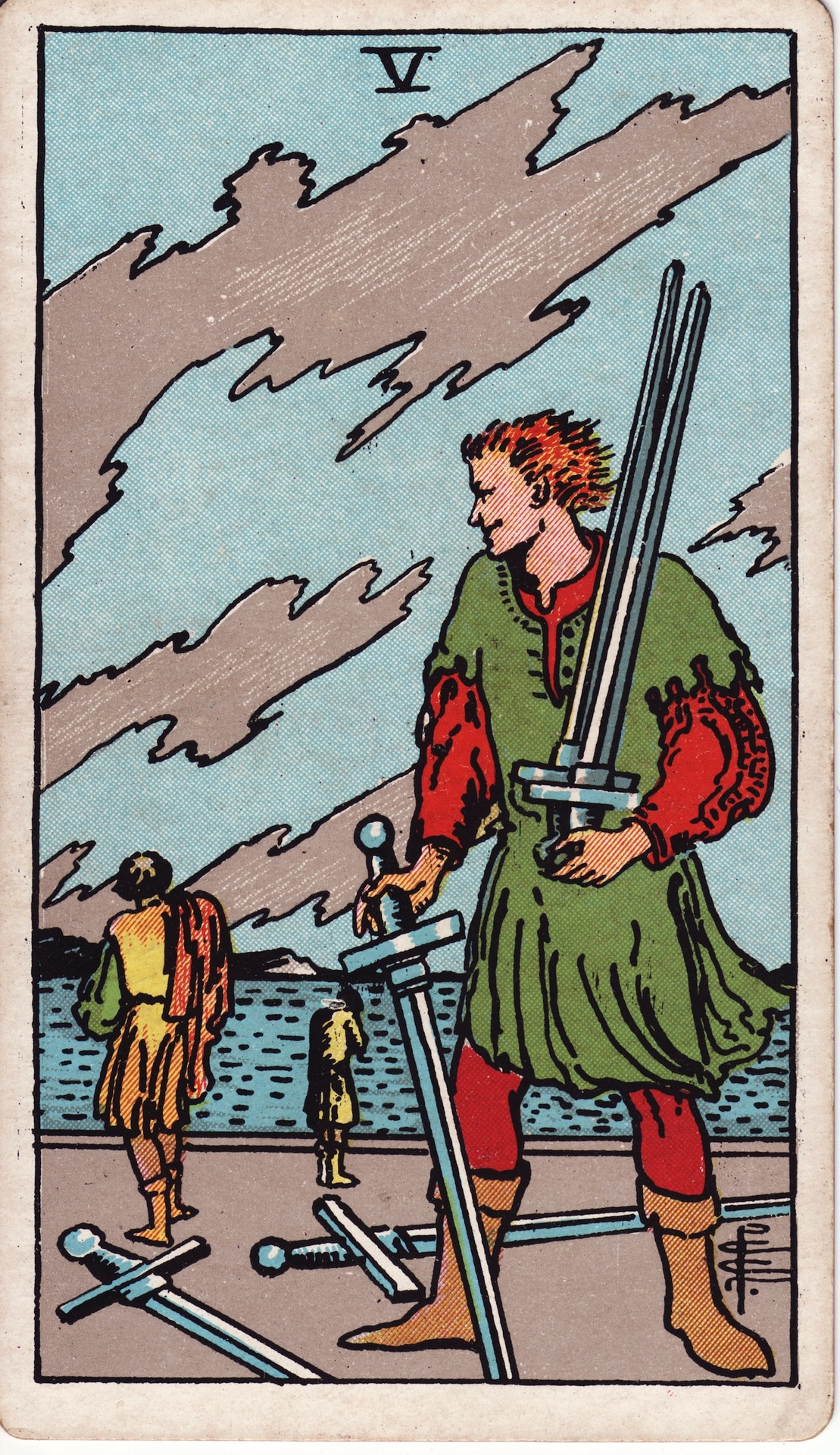
Five of Swords

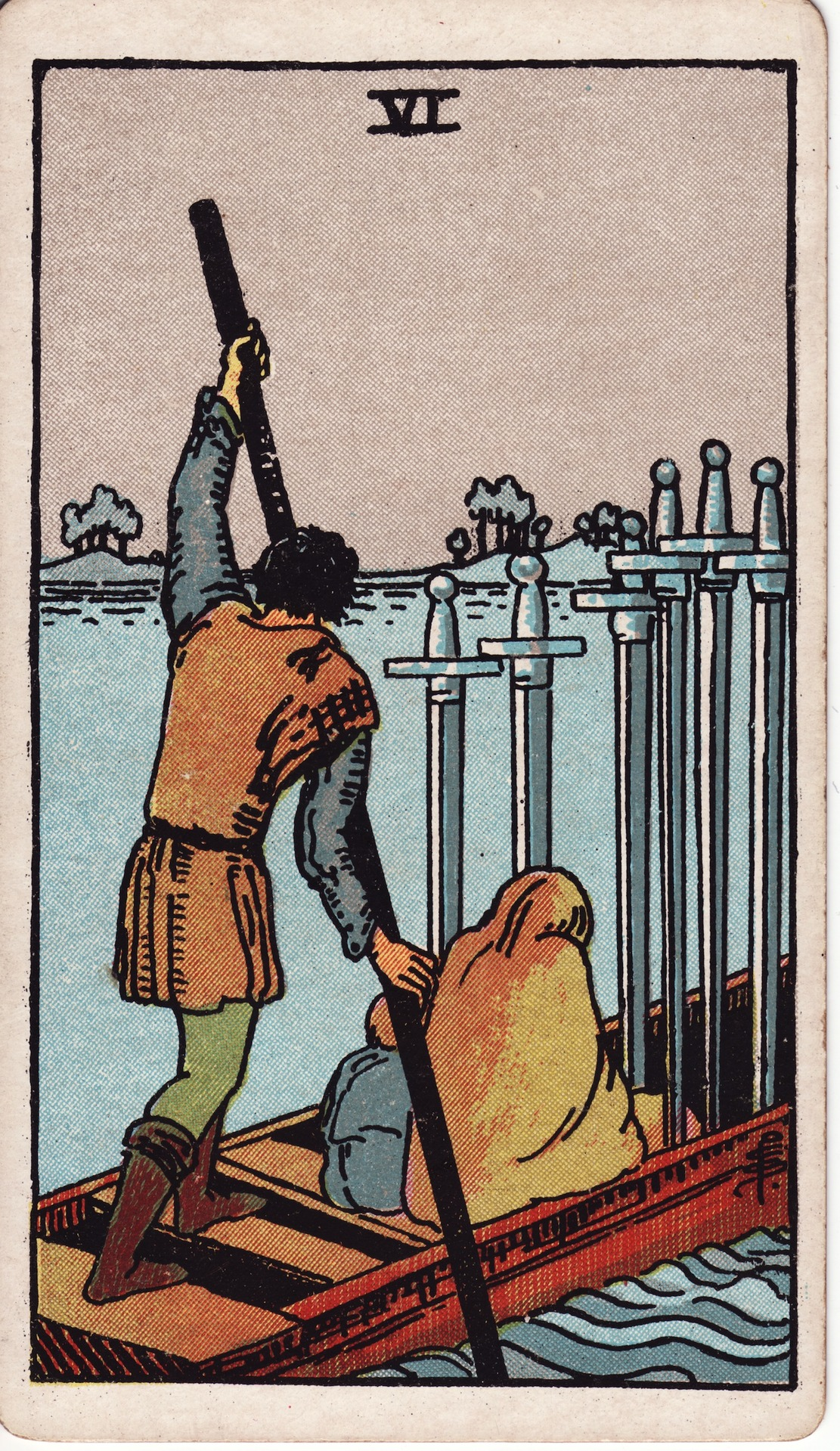
Six of Swords

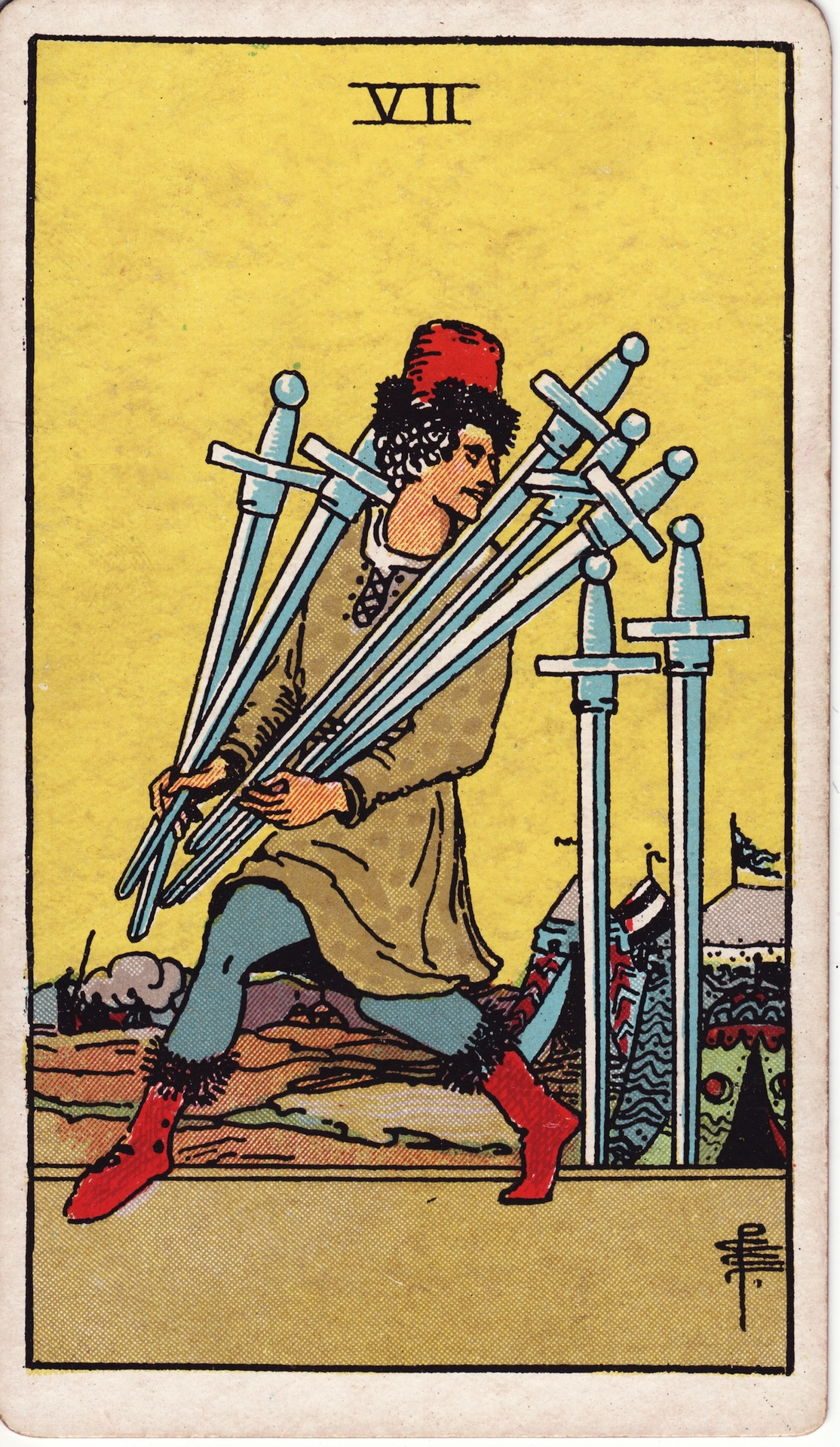
Seven of Swords

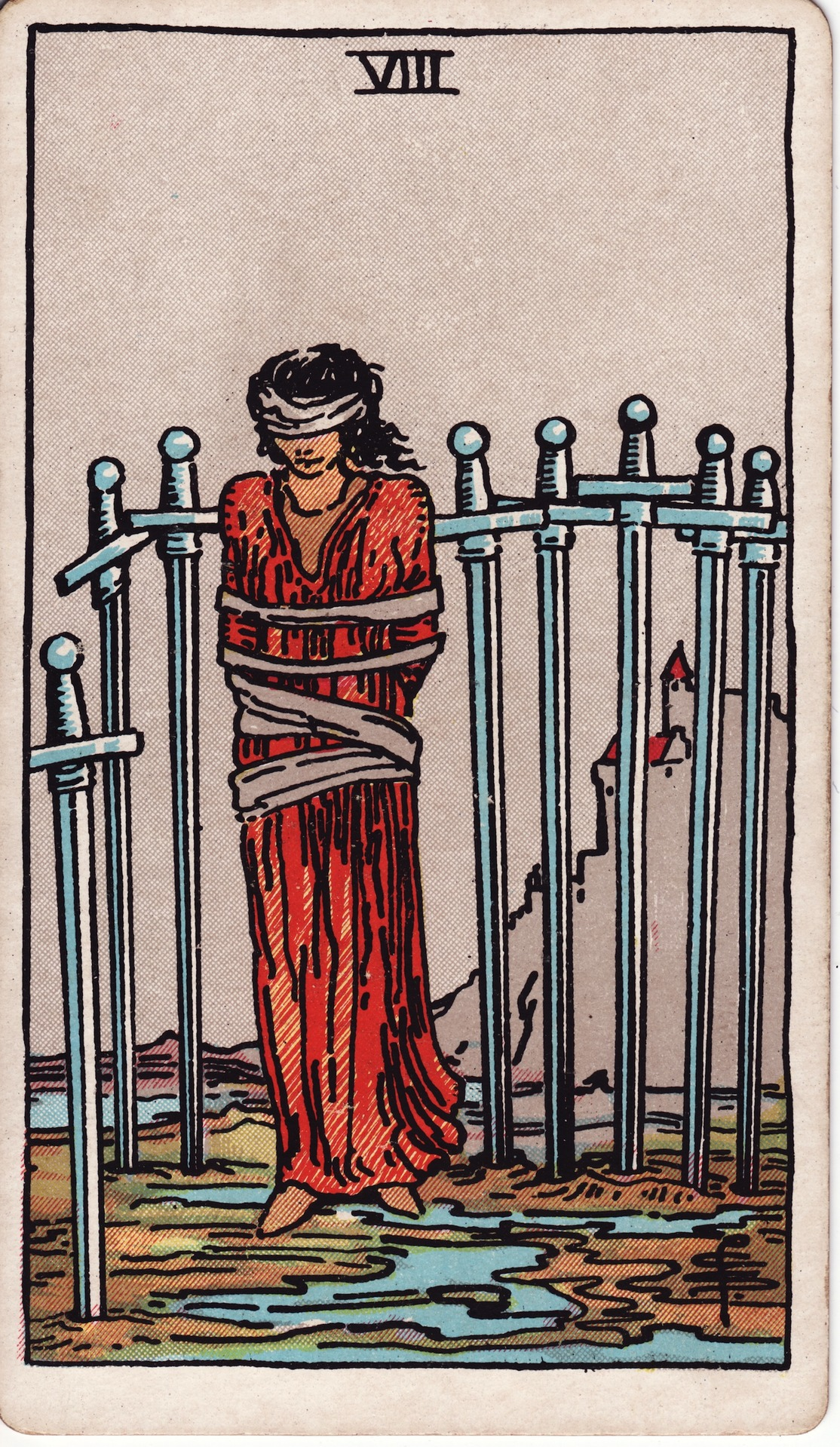
Eight of Swords

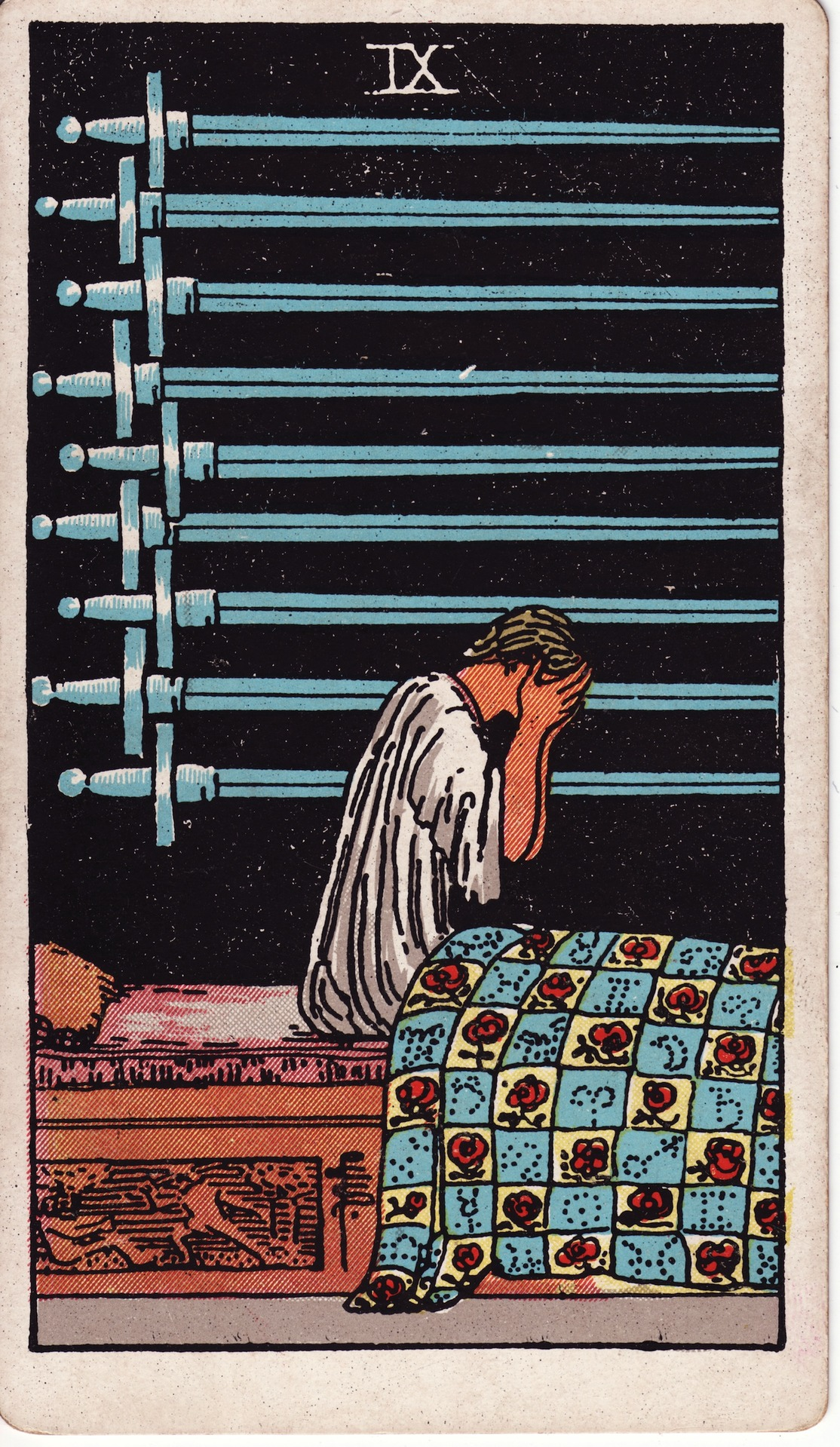
Nine of Swords

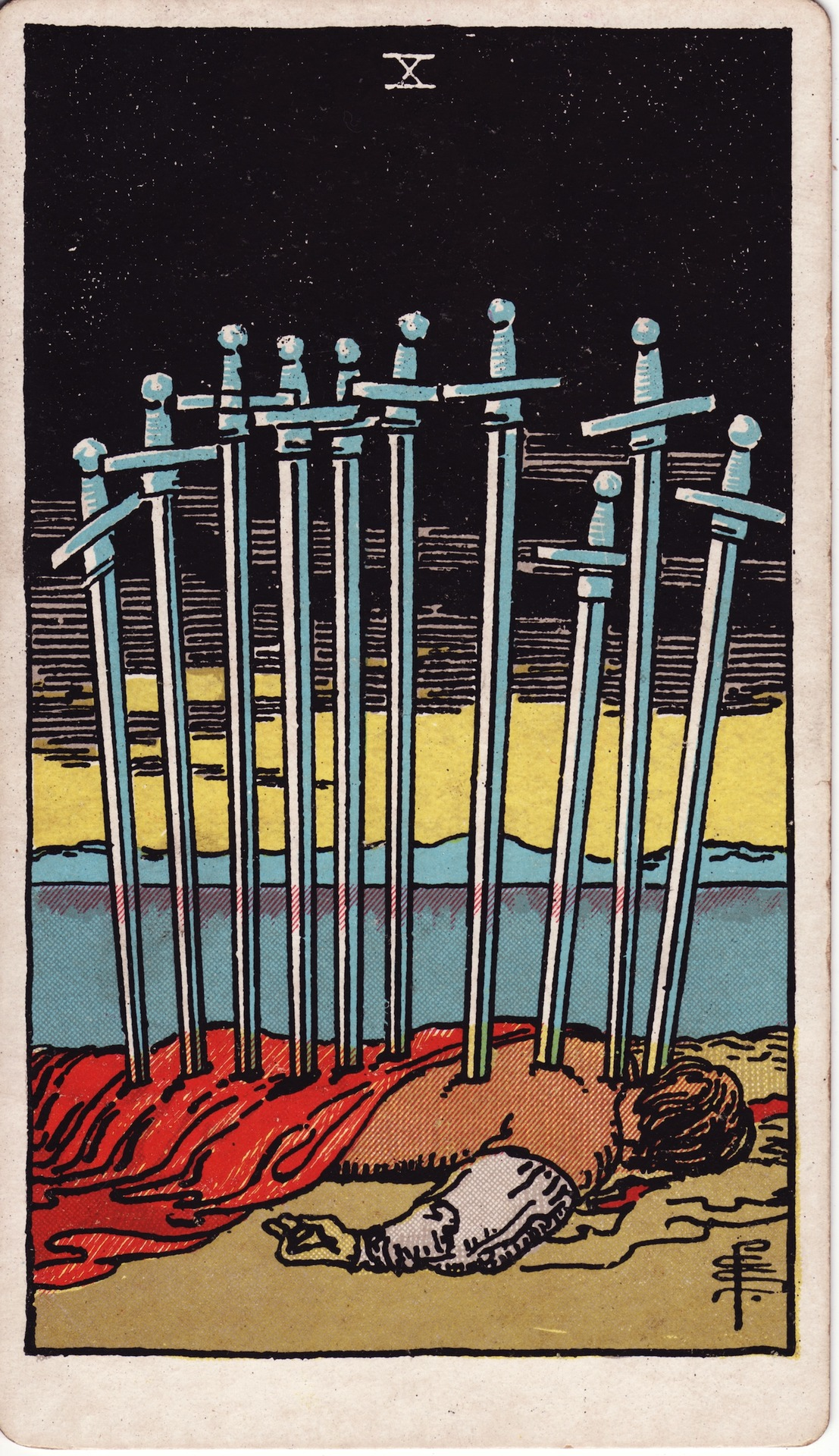
Ten of Swords
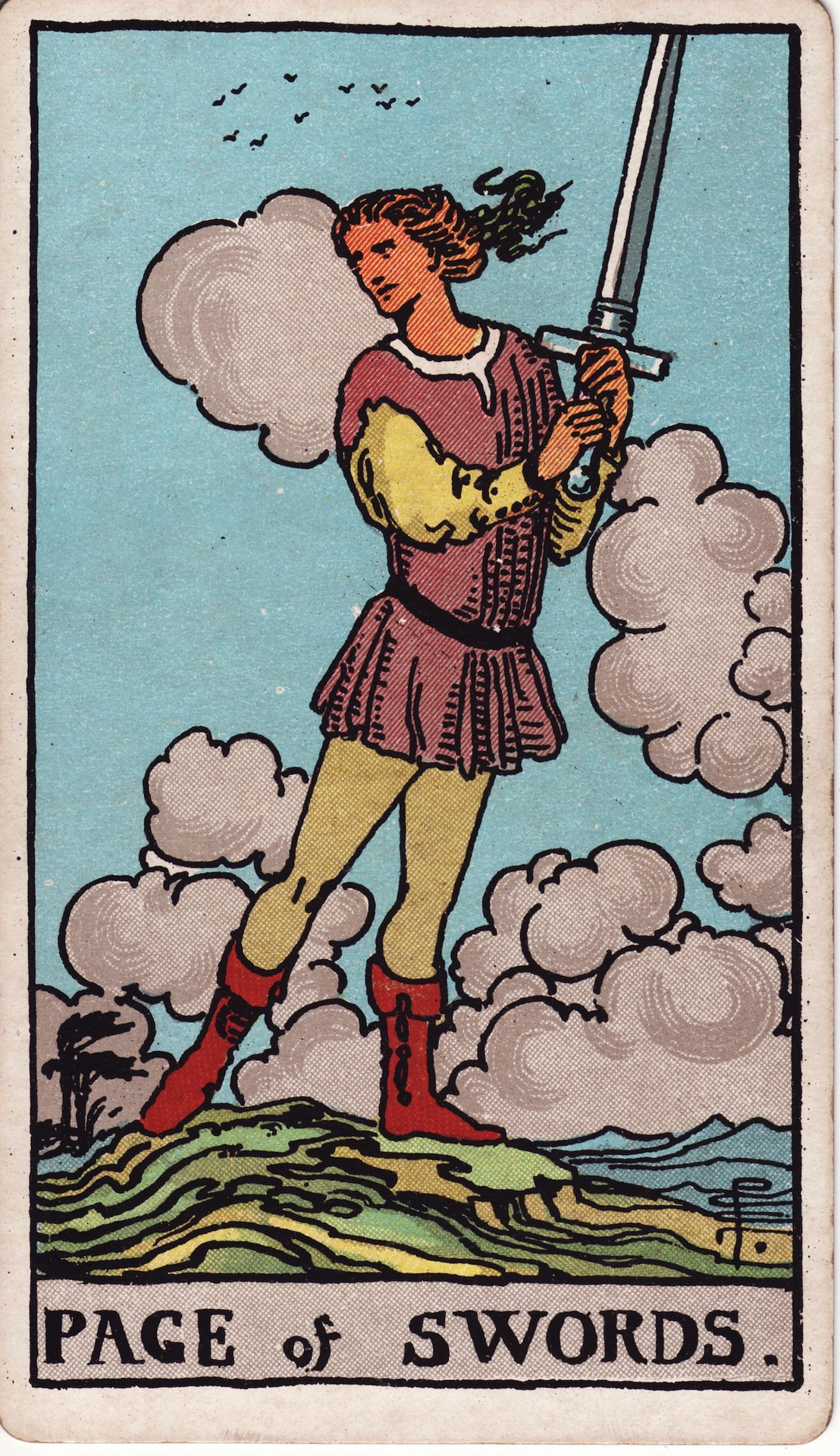
Page of Swords

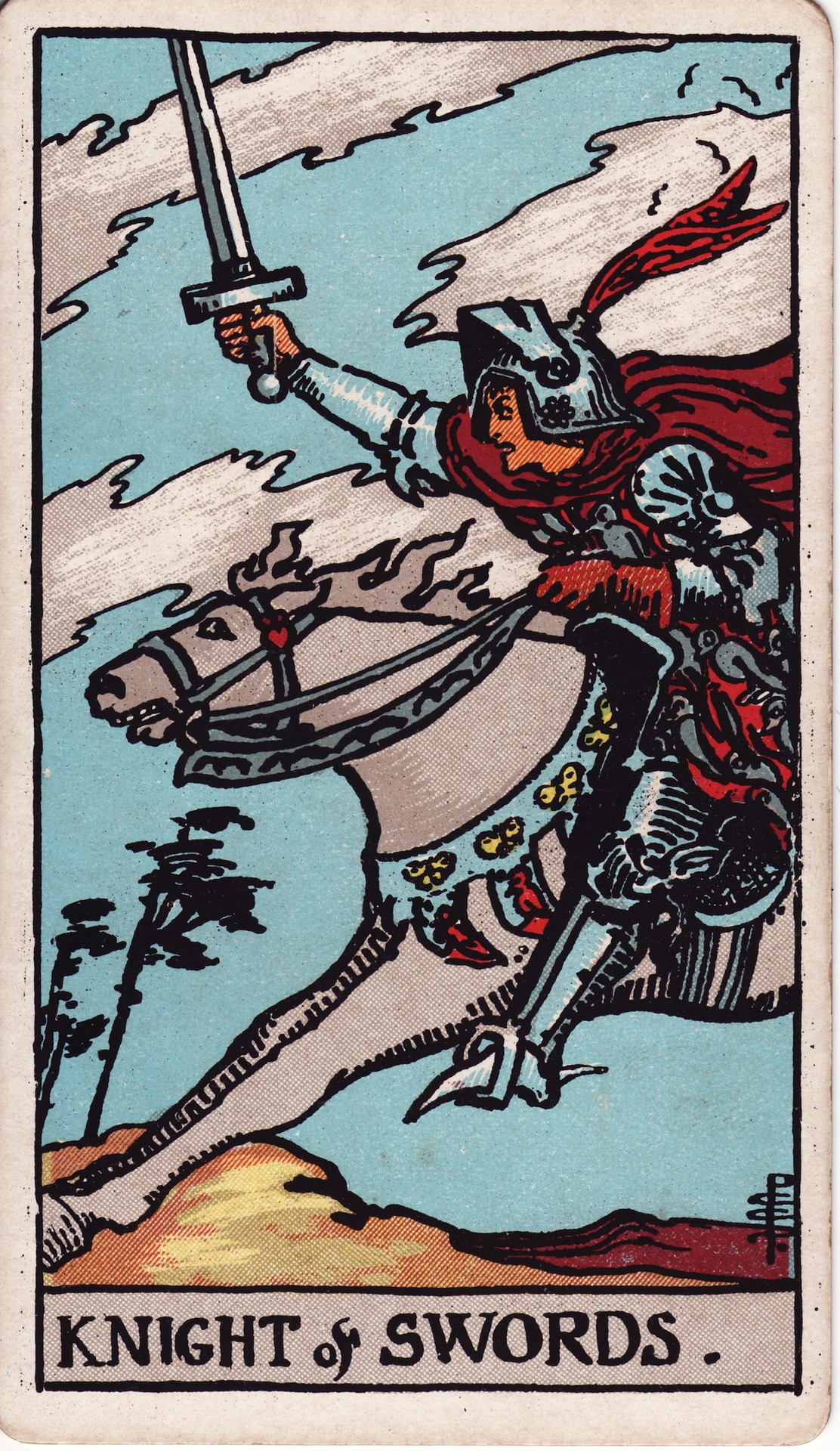
Knight of Swords

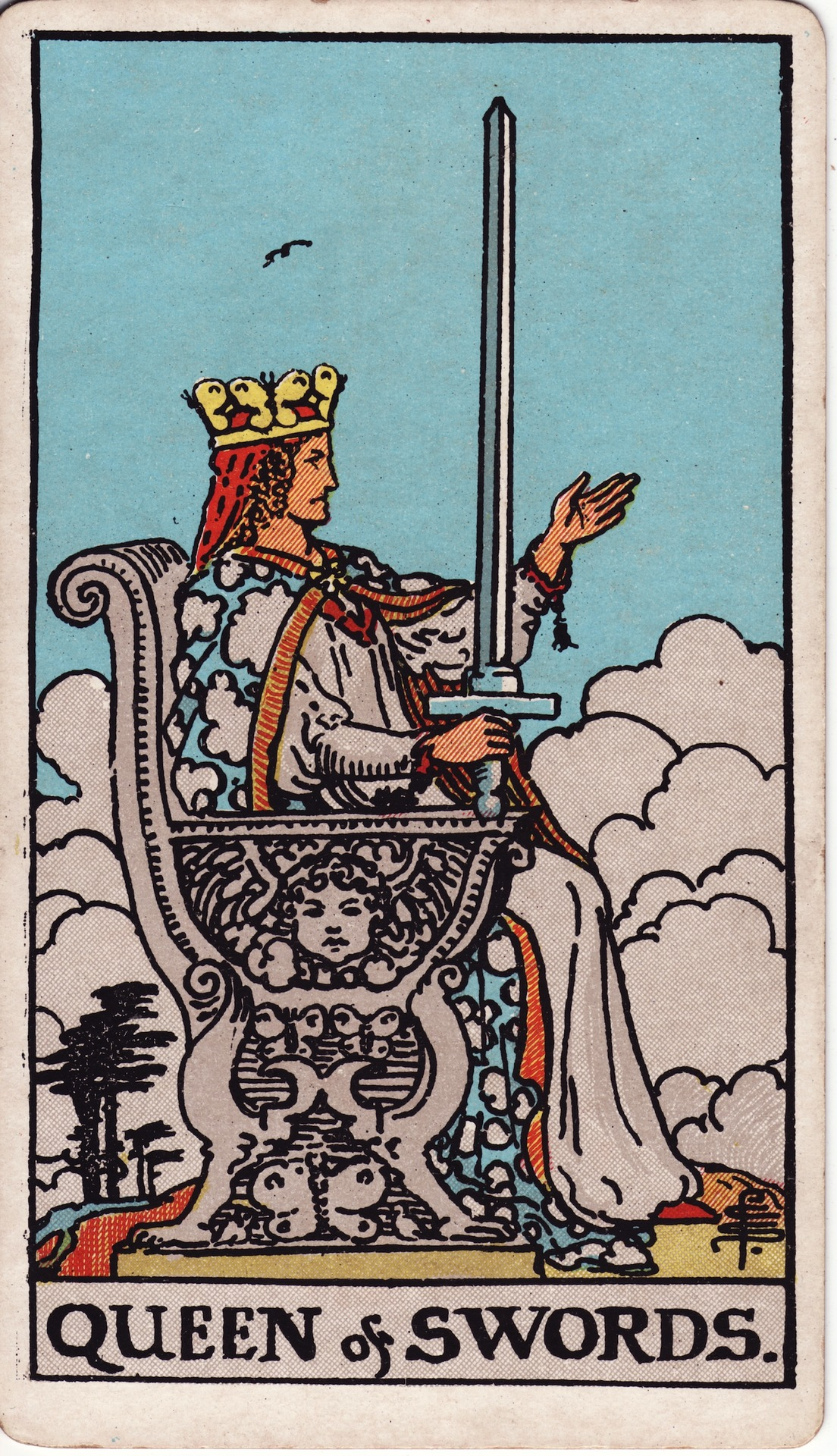
Queen of Swords

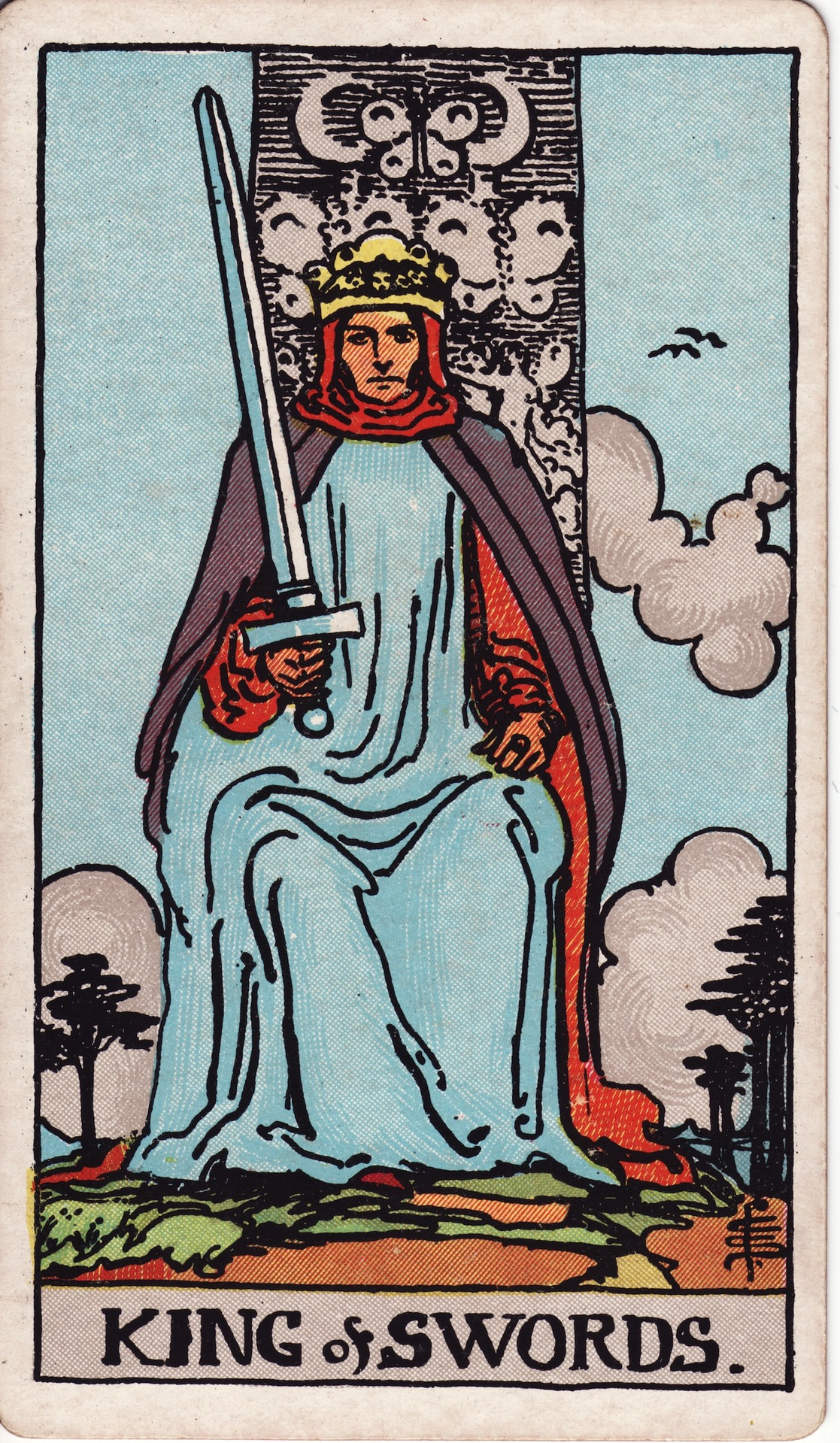
King of Swords

== Planetary associations ==
In the Hermetic Order of the Golden Dawn, number cards are associated with planets, corresponding to their placement in Kabbalah.

- Threes - Saturn
- Fours - Jupiter
- Fives - Mars
- Sixes - Sun
- Sevens - Venus
- Eights - Mercury
- Nines - Moon
- Tens - Earth
