= Coin (disambiguation) =

A coin is a small, flat, round piece of metal or plastic that is used as currency.

Coin or Coins may also refer to:

== Places ==
=== France ===
- Coin-lès-Cuvry, a municipality in Moselle
- Coin-sur-Seille, a municipality in Moselle
- Mont Coin, a mountain in Savoie

=== Spain ===
- Coín, a town and municipality in Málaga province, Spain

=== United States ===
- Coin, Arkansas, an unincorporated community
- Coin, Iowa, a city
- Coin, Kentucky, an unincorporated community
- Coin, Minnesota, an unincorporated community
- Coin, Missouri, a ghost town
- Coin, Nevada, an unincorporated community

== Arts, entertainment, and media ==
- Coin (band), an American indie pop band, and their album COIN
- Coin Coin, a musical work by Matana Roberts
- Coins (suit), a card suit in Latin-suited playing cards
- Coins, the currency of the Mario franchise
- Master of Coin, a fictitious role represented on the King's Small Council, e.g., by Petyr Baelish, in Game of Thrones
- President Alma Coin, a character in The Hunger Games novels
- Coin, a character in the Terry Pratchett novel Sourcery
- "Coins" (Juliet Bravo), a 1980 television episode
- Coins (magazine), a numismatic magazine

=== Tarot ===
- Suit of coins, a card suit used in tarot, also known as pentacles
  - Ace of Coins, the ace card from the suit of coins or pentacles
  - Two of Coins, the two card from the suit of coins or pentacles
  - Three of Coins, the three card from the suit of coins or pentacles
  - Four of Coins, the four card from the suit of coins or pentacles
  - Five of Coins, the five card from the suit of coins or pentacles
  - Six of Coins, the six card from the suit of coins or pentacles
  - Seven of Coins, the seven card from the suit of coins or pentacles
  - Eight of Coins, the eight card from the suit of coins or pentacles
  - Nine of Coins, the nine card from the suit of coins or pentacles
  - Ten of Coins, the ten card from the suit of coins or pentacles
  - Knight of Coins, the knight card from the suit of coins or pentacles
  - Queen of Coins, the queen card from the suit of coins or pentacles
  - King of Coins, the king card from the suit of coins or pentacles

== Science and technology ==
- Coin, a digital device; the startup company behind it was acquired by Fitbit
- Coin, a unit of cryptocurrency
- Coin3D, a 3D computer graphics application programming interface
- Conical intersection, or COIN

== Other uses ==
- Coin (surname)
- Coin (department store), an Italian department store chain
- Coin, coined, to make a new word or phrase; see Neologism

== See also ==
- COIN (disambiguation)
- Coinage (disambiguation)
- Coining (disambiguation)
- Quoin (disambiguation), pronounced like coin
- Specie (disambiguation), meanings include coin, or commodity money
- William Hope Harvey, an advocate of bimetallism who had the nickname "Coin"
