= Suit of coins =

Tarot playing card suit

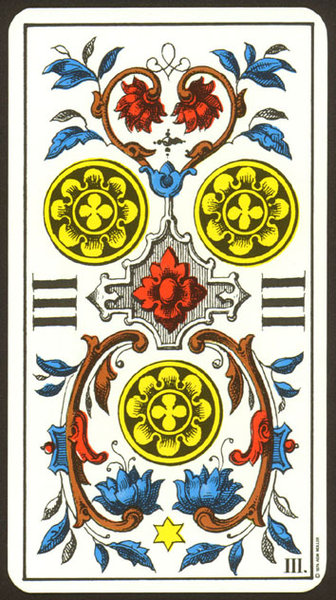
- Three of Coins from the 1JJ Tarot deck
- Deck: Minor Arcana

The suit of coins is one of the four suits used in tarot decks with Latin-suited cards. It is derived from the suit of coins in Italian and Spanish card playing packs.

In occult uses of tarot, Coins is considered part of the "Minor Arcana", and may alternately be known as the suit of pentacles, though this has no basis in its original use for card games. "Pentacles" is its name in the Rider–Waite Tarot and its derivatives, while disks is its name in the Thoth Tarot and its derivatives. Like the other tarot suits, it contains fourteen cards: ace (one), two through ten, page, knight, queen and king.

== Divinatory and occult meanings ==
In occult and divinatory usage the suit is connected with the classical element of Earth, the physical body and possessions or wealth. Coins as a Latin suit represent the feudal class of traders, and therefore to worldly matters in general. Associated physical characteristics include dark hair and eyes, dark complexion, and sturdy build.

In the Rider–Waite tarot deck and derivative decks, the suit is called the suit of pentacles, and each card incorporates one or more discs each displaying a pentacle. In Aleister Crowley's The Book of Thoth it is called the suit of disks, and the cards are associated with the Taurus, Virgo and Capricorn signs of the Zodiac.

=== Cards in the suit of coins ===
- The Ace of Coins is depicted as a hand holding a Pentacle or a coin, with a five-pointed star on it, out of a cloud. There is a lush garden behind, suggesting plenty. It can also be seen as the Garden of Eden. Outside the garden can be seen two mountain peaks, suggesting the right and left pillars of the Qabalah. Both lead to higher amounts of wealth. The flowers in the garden are white—symbolizing innocence, perhaps innocent relationships such as the friendship shared by Adam and Eve before the fall. One of the flowers is in the shape of a cross, possibly representing self-sacrifice. This sacrifice could be as simple as suffering a natural death, as self-sacrifice is the only way into heaven. As with all the Aces, the Ace of Pentacles symbolises a beginning and something new being offered. This will often be a new source of money coming to someone. It is usually extra regular money of some description. It can indicate new opportunities leading to increased prosperity. The card indicates a change for the better financially, or at least, the opportunities are there to improve one's financial situation. It can also point to improved cash flow through better money management.
- The Two of Coins, when upright, means to juggle, to struggle in a positive influence, to balance (indeed, to juggle and balance at the same time), to maintain. The balance of equilibrium is actively being maintained here; there is a self-realized aspect of maintenance. The Reversed meaning of the card means imbalances, excess juggling, excess struggle, the advice of the card is to re-dress balance.
- The Three of Coins has numerous positive attributes assigned to it, including the mastery of a skill in trade or work; achieving perfection; artistic ability; and dignity through renown, rank or power. Negative attributes (when card is in reverse) include sloppiness resulting in a lower quality outcome; lack of skill; banal ideas; and preoccupation with off-task concerns.
- The Four of Coins refers to a lover of material wealth, one who hoards things of value with no prospect of sharing. In contrast, when the Four of Pentacles is in reverse it warns against the tendency of being a spendthrift.
- The Five of Coins suggests a grim and hard situation, a quagmire which the subjects won't soon be out of. The Querent may be ambivalent, trapped in indecision, and feeling left out or shut off, but determined. The church windows imply charities and hopes, difficult to satisfy, but still worth fighting for. The right figure pictured isn't obviously friend or foe to the man on crutches, suggesting an uncertain relation.
- The Six of Coins depicts a merchant weighing money in a pair of scales and distributing it to the needy and distressed. It signifies gratification, but also vigilance, for one cannot always gratify all the distressed. Reversed, the card represents desire, cupidity, envy, jealousy and illusion.
- The Seven of Coins often means movement.
- The Eight of Coins depicts an artist in stone at his work, which he exhibits in the form of trophies. Divinatory Meanings: Work, employment, commission, craftsmanship, skill in craft and business, perhaps in the preparatory stage. Steady patience with achievement kept in mind. Reversed: Voided ambition, vanity, cupidity, exaction, usury. It may also signify the possession of skill, in the sense of the ingenious mind turned to cunning and intrigue.
- The Nine of Coins depicts an aristocratic woman surrounded by an abundance of grapevines on a large estate, most likely representing a fine material status. Her robe is decorated with flowers, and a hooded falcon rests at ease on her arm. Falconry is an ancient sport which has been very popular among aristocrats and rulers of the past. The woman holds her falcon comfortably—without much excitement or fear (falcons are predators, after all)—which suggests she is well familiar with the wealth and power that this sport represents and feels comfortable with it. It is also noteworthy to mention that the falcon is hooded, meaning “not engaged” to pursue its prey. This suggests that the woman is aware of her power but chooses to keep it controlled. She knows her power and also knows how and when to apply it, which is a sign of wisdom. A young snail, denoted by a blue shell, makes its way across her path. She is unaware of its potentially fatal proximity. When upright, it means being abundant, sophisticated, wise and successful.
- The Ten of Coins orders the coins according to the structure of the kabbalistic Tree of Life. It depicts an old man with a bodyguard talking to a woman. It is often associated with family matters, financial matters or a mix of the two. Some sources associate it with affluence or even riches. It may reflect a working environment. In the Thoth Tarot deck this card is labeled Wealth, and is associated with the third decan of Virgo, a Sign said to be ruled by Mercury, the third decan is ruled by Venus.
- The Page of Coins is often used to represent a young person.
- The Knight of Coins can be used to represent a young man who is dark of complexion and features. This combines the symbolism of dark completion with the suit of coins, and teenage/young adult males with knights. The card may also represent someone who is stubborn or hard-working, serious, or set in their ways. One might also use this card when someone is grappling with a question where one of those issues is coming up—when they have a question about work or home life, or a question about whether to stand their ground on an issue. Tarot's Knights, with the exception of the Knight of Swords, represent defensiveness. The Rider–Waite deck added armour to the traditional depictions (e.g. the Marseilles Tarot) of these Knights as well as disarming them. The Knight of Coins may therefore represent being materially defensive or guarding one's health.
- The Queen of Coins is described as "Sensual and earthy, she enjoys abundance in many areas of her life. A lover of luxury, she is quick to share her wealth". The Queen of Pentacles can indicate fertility or a pregnancy. Like all court cards, the Queen of Coins is commonly interpreted to refer to a person playing some role in the life of the questioner; although it may represent the inquirer. Queens are said to represent mother figures and adult women, or young women mature for their years; women of knowledge and wisdom. She can also be a business woman, a patron of the arts, a provider, or one that works hard for material success. She is a maternal, nurturing, down-to-earth person, who is concerned with the welfare of others, especially those she cares for. The interpreted physical characteristics of the suit of coins include dark hair and eyes, dark complexions and sturdy build. In the Reversed aspect, this Queen neglects her responsibilities, keeping up appearances regardless of circumstances.
- The King of Coins depicts a mature man of considerable earthly power, usually depicted as a diplomatic business-man with a lot of practical wisdom. The king of pentacles can be miserly at times. He has a taste for sensual delights and earthly gifts. Here is a man who has a social standing and is big on keeping up with the Joneses. On the downside, he can be a man of phenomenally huge ego, the one whom the querent dare not cross. The card depicts a man who can help the querent grasp the social and practical knowledge that he needs to acquire wealth or respectability. As with the rest of the court cards, the appearance of this card may signify contact with a person of this high stature. It does not necessarily indicate material riches to the querent, unless this has been further supported by other cards. The Rider–Waite deck depicts a man sitting on a black throne adorned with a gold bull. Grapes appear on his clothes, and a castle is in the background.

=== Card images in the Rider–Waite tarot deck ===
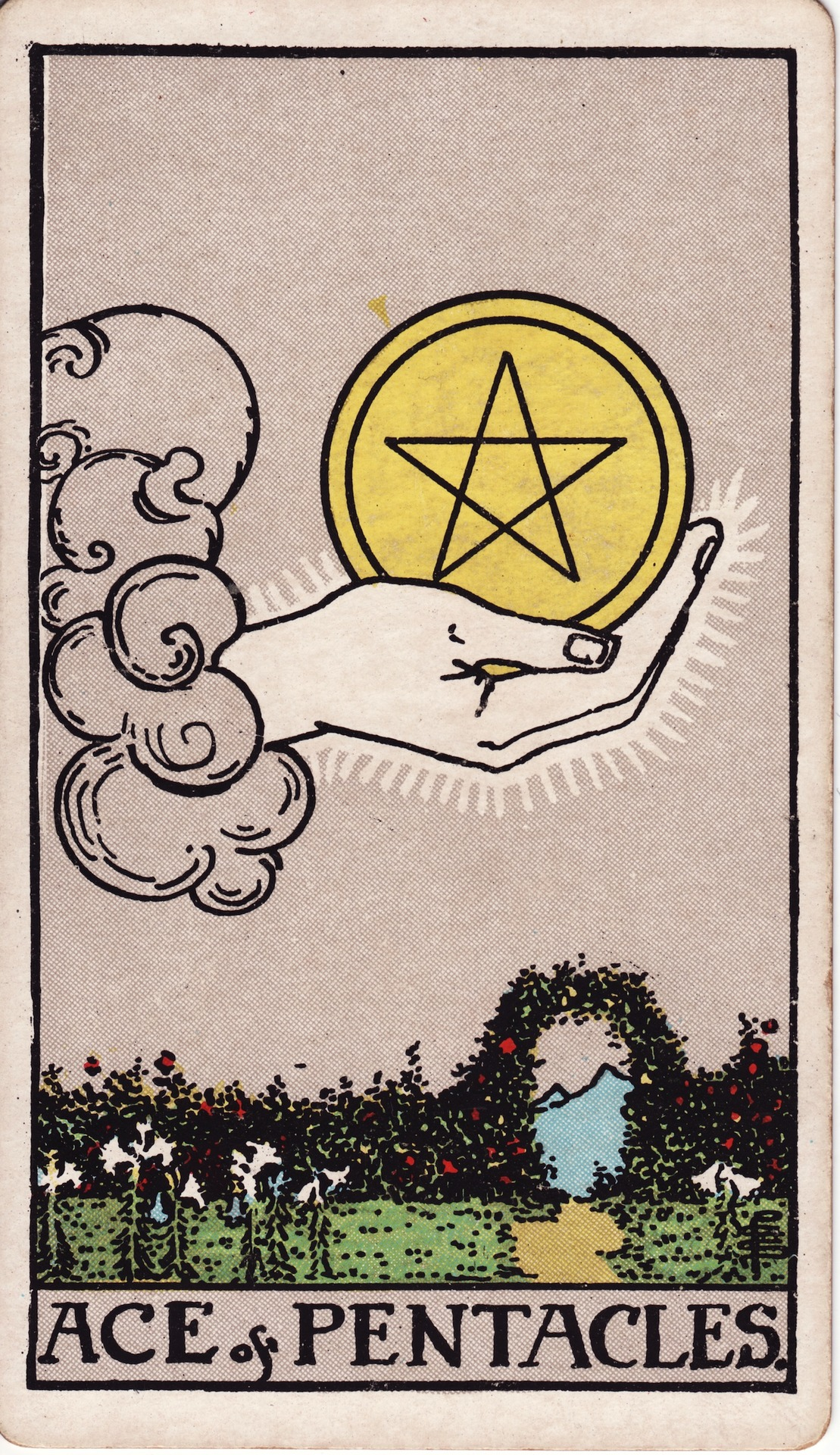
Ace of Coins

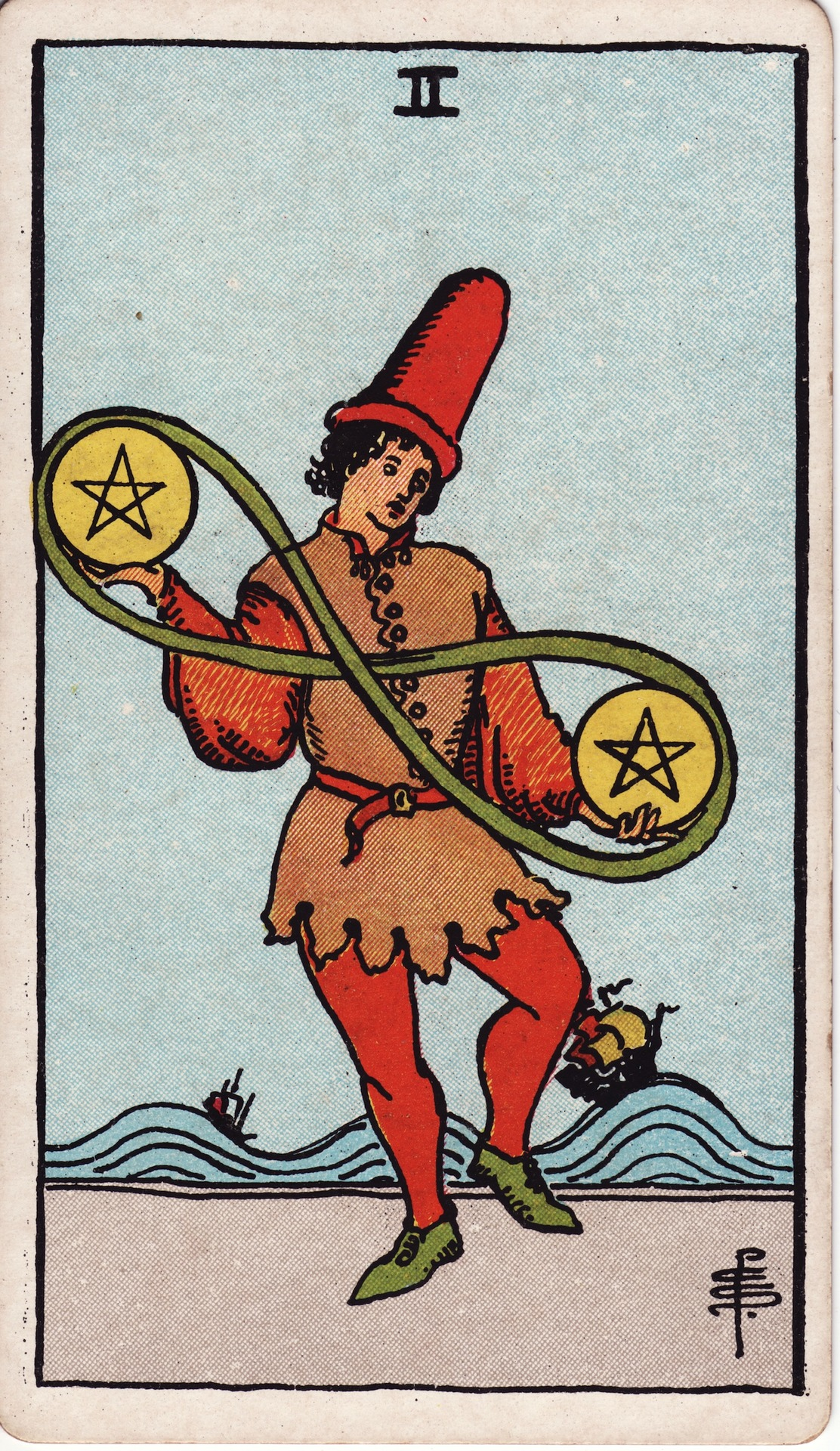
Two of Coins

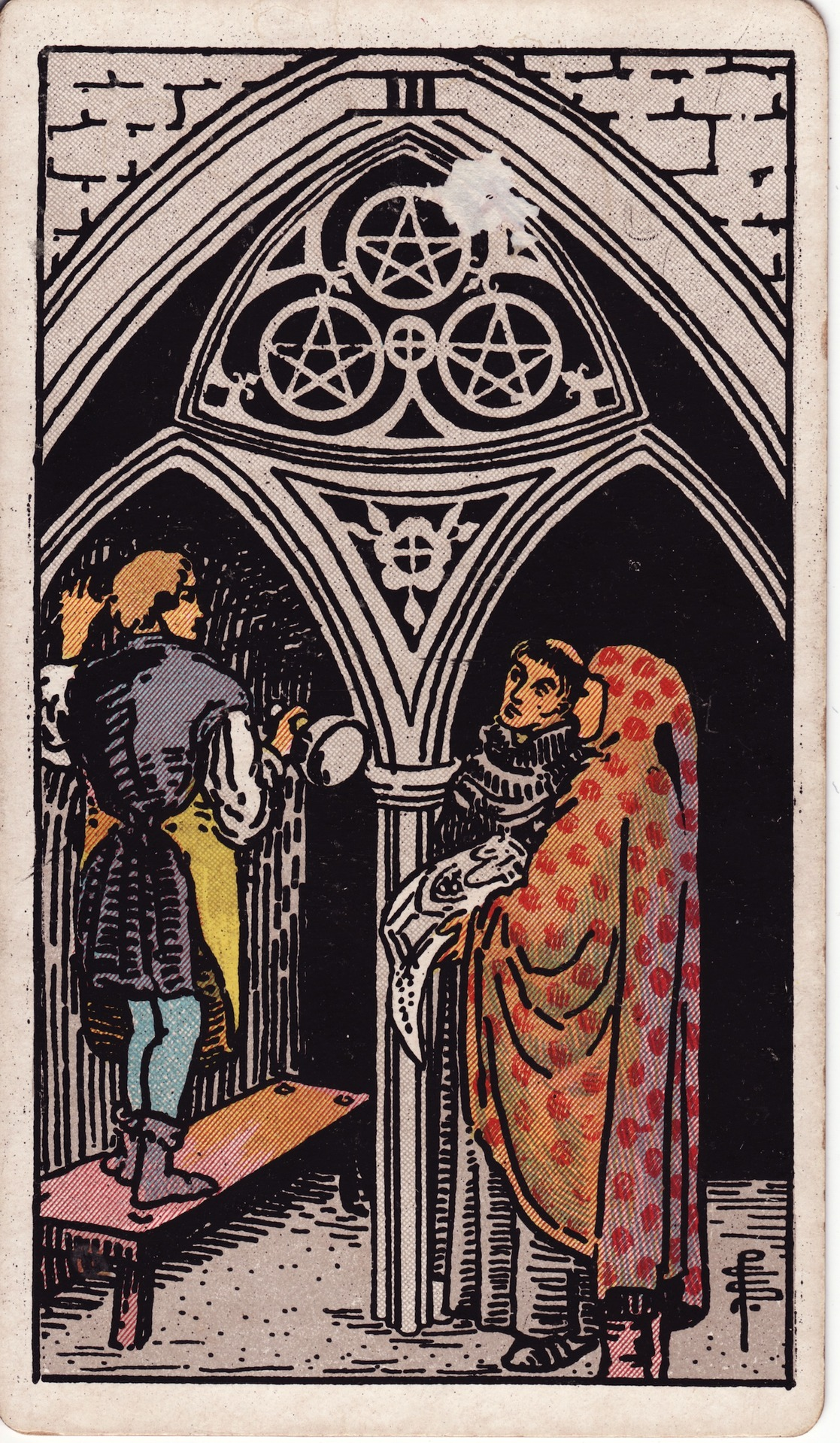
Three of Coins

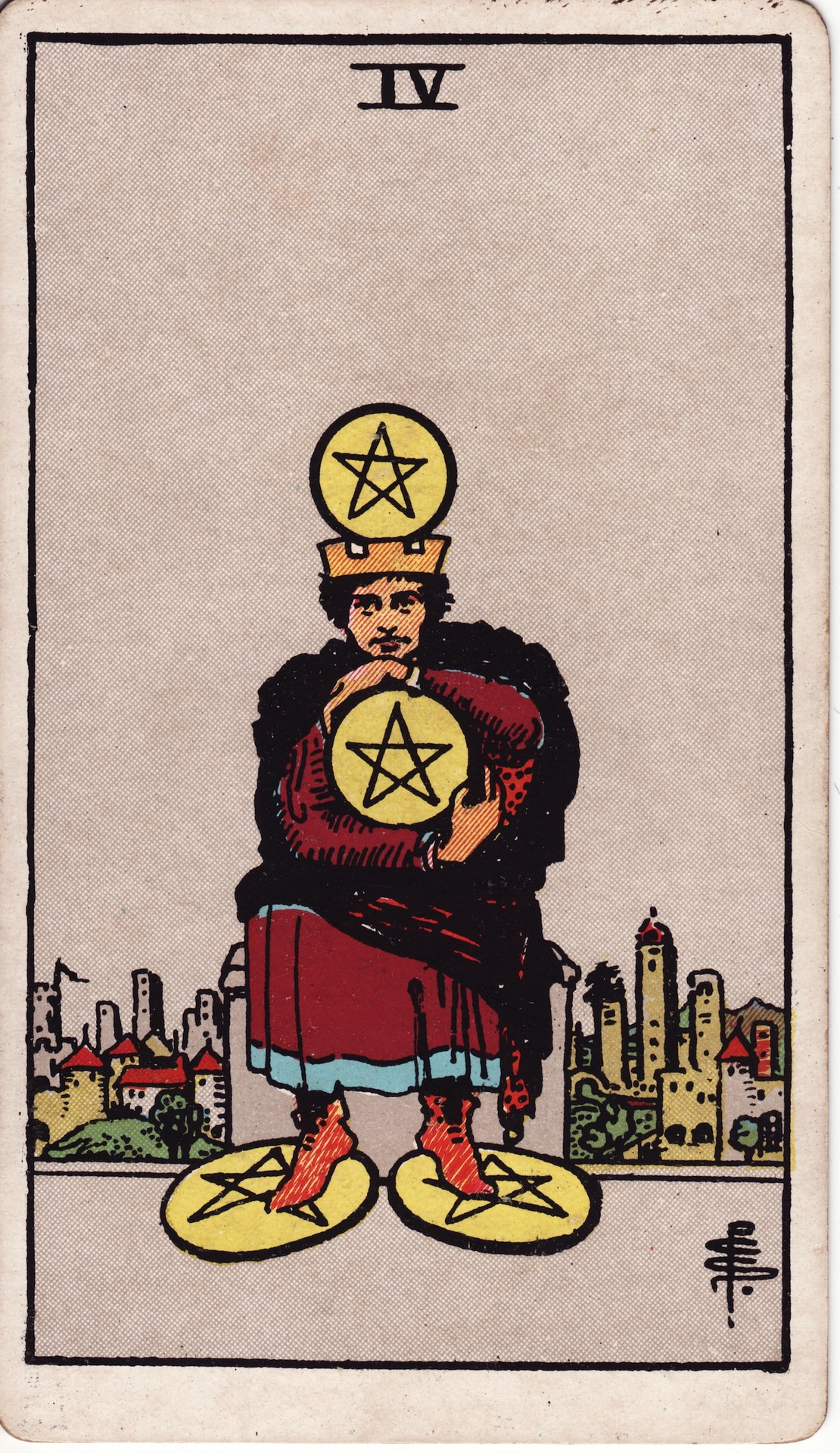
Four of Coins

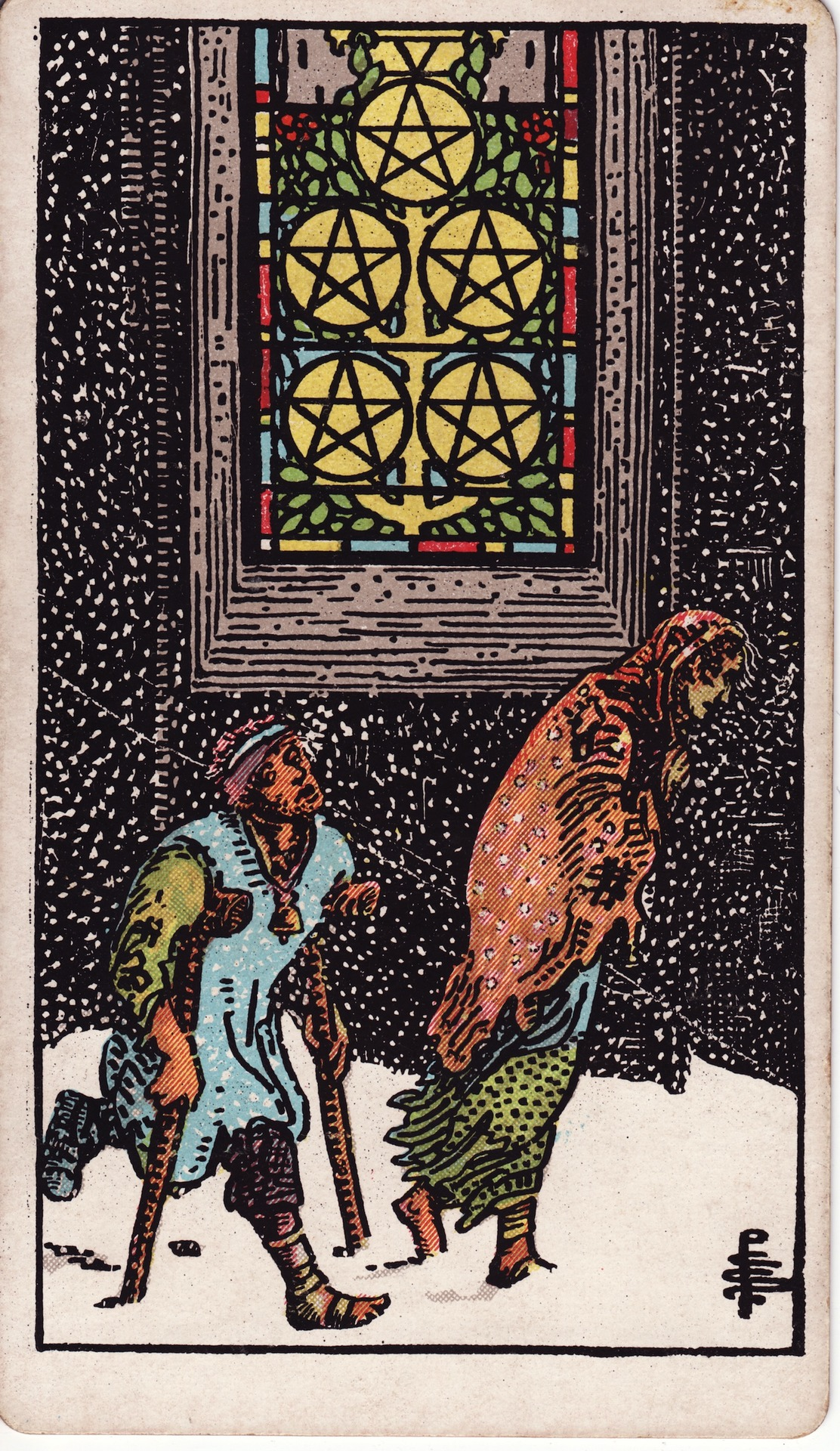
Five of Coins

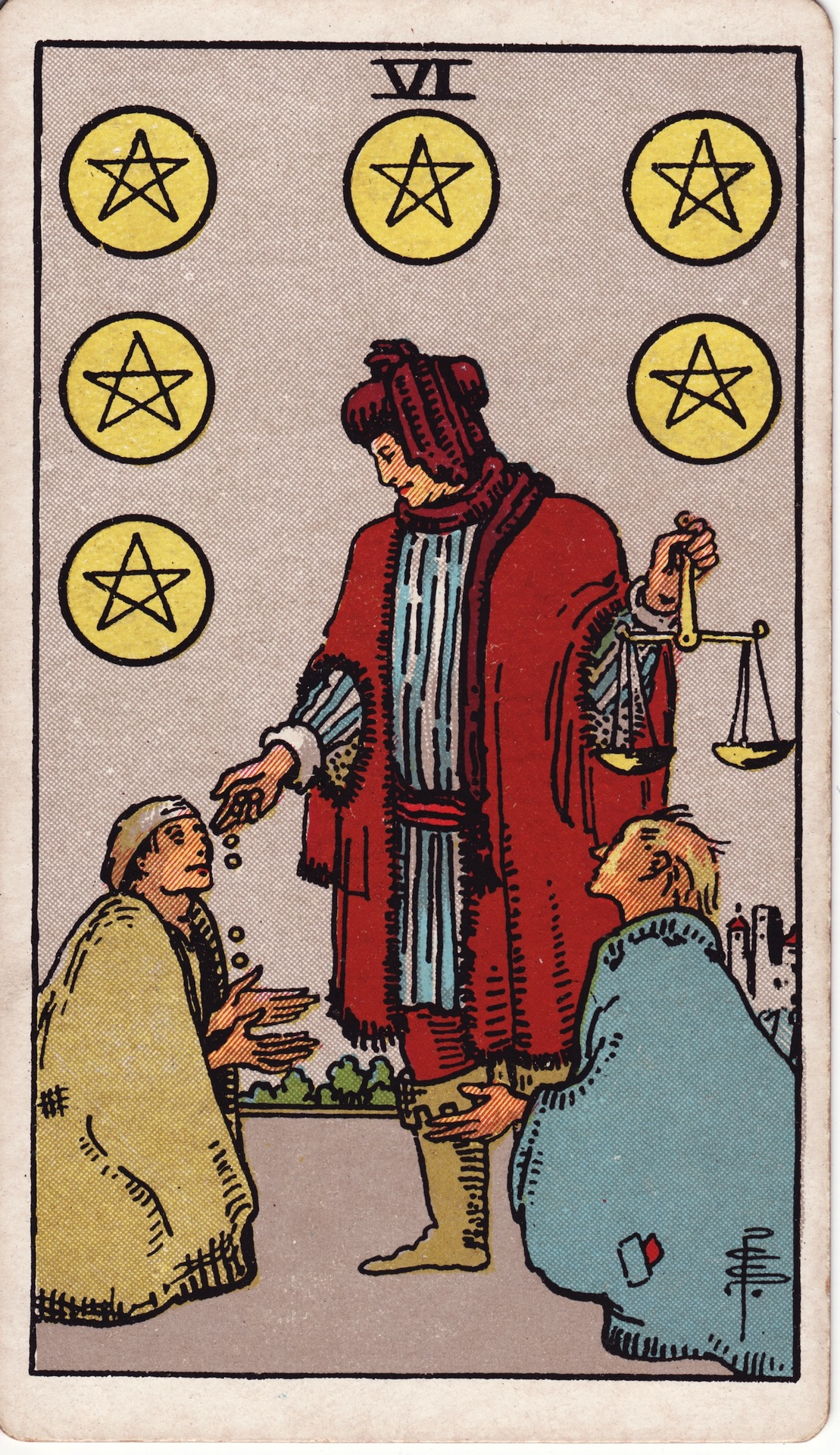
Six of Coins

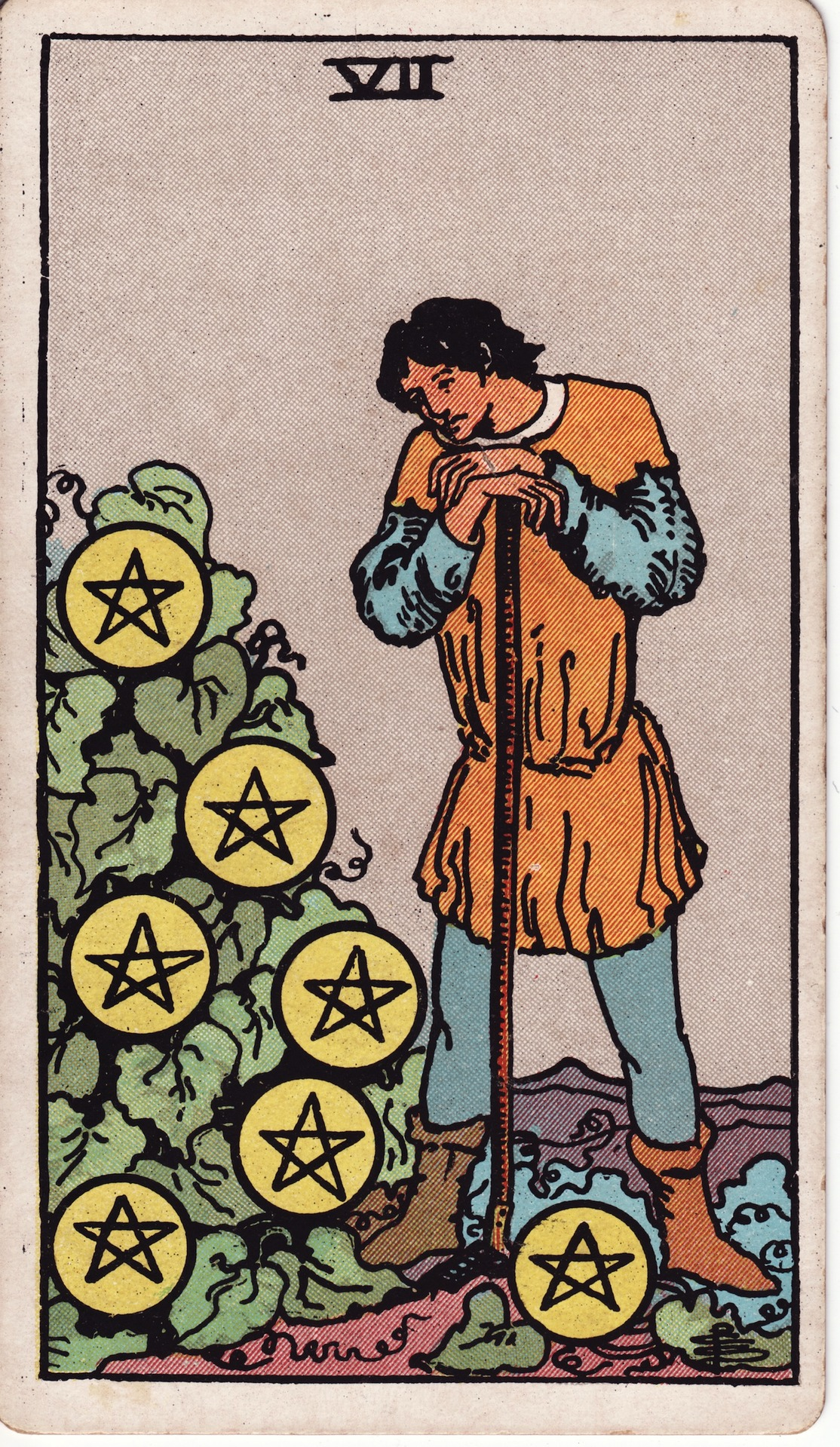
Seven of Coins

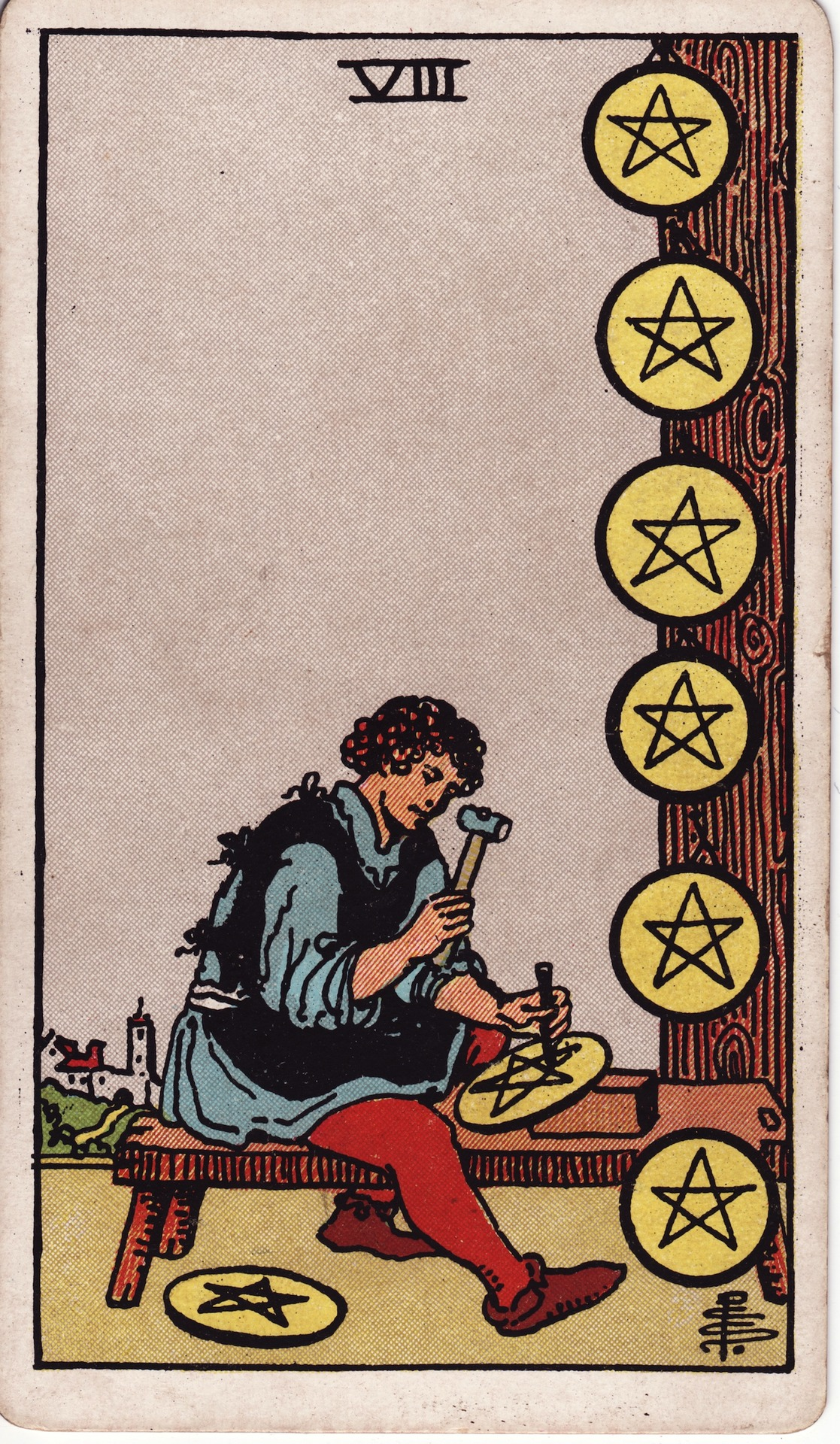
Eight of Coins

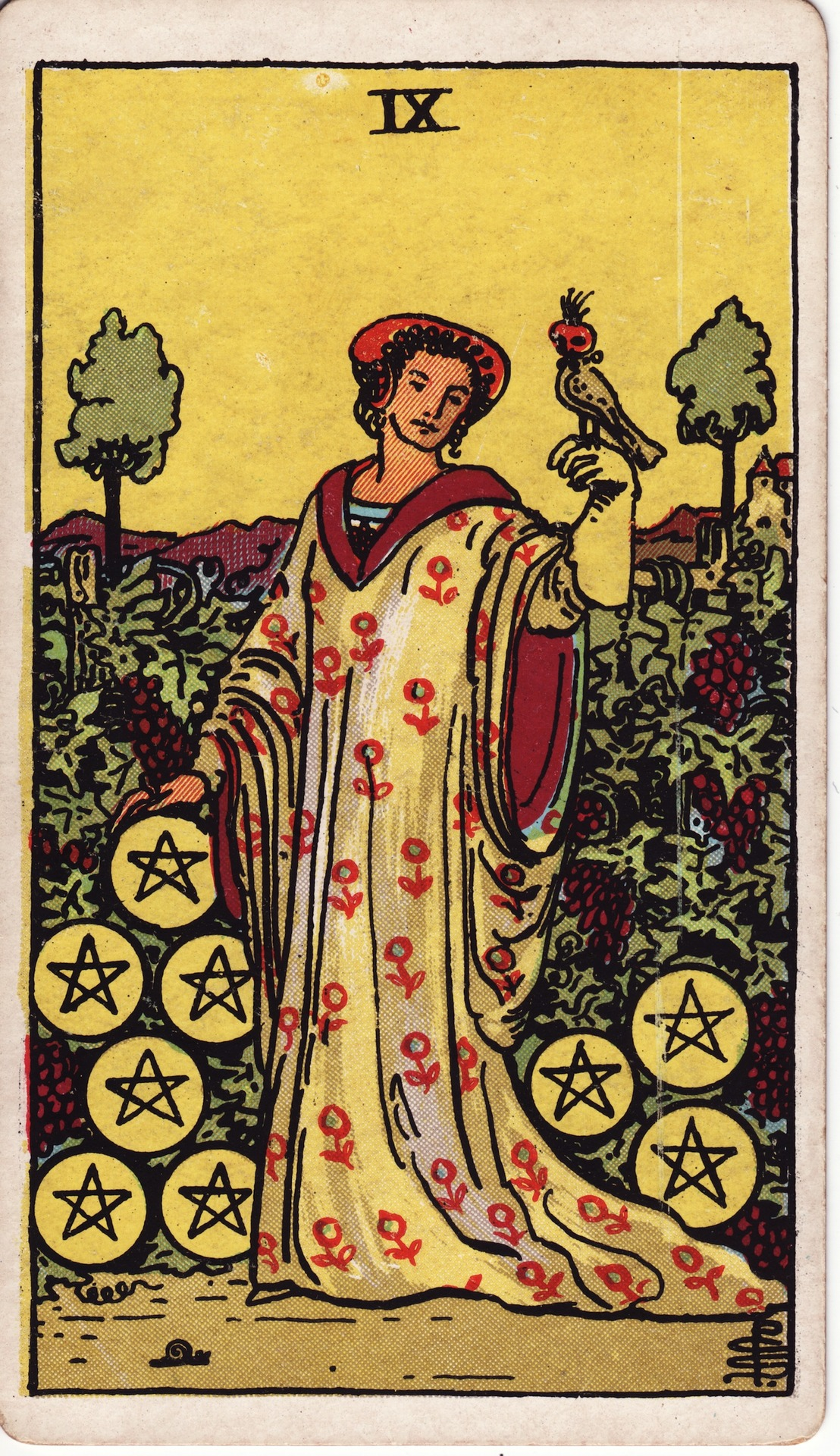
Nine of Coins

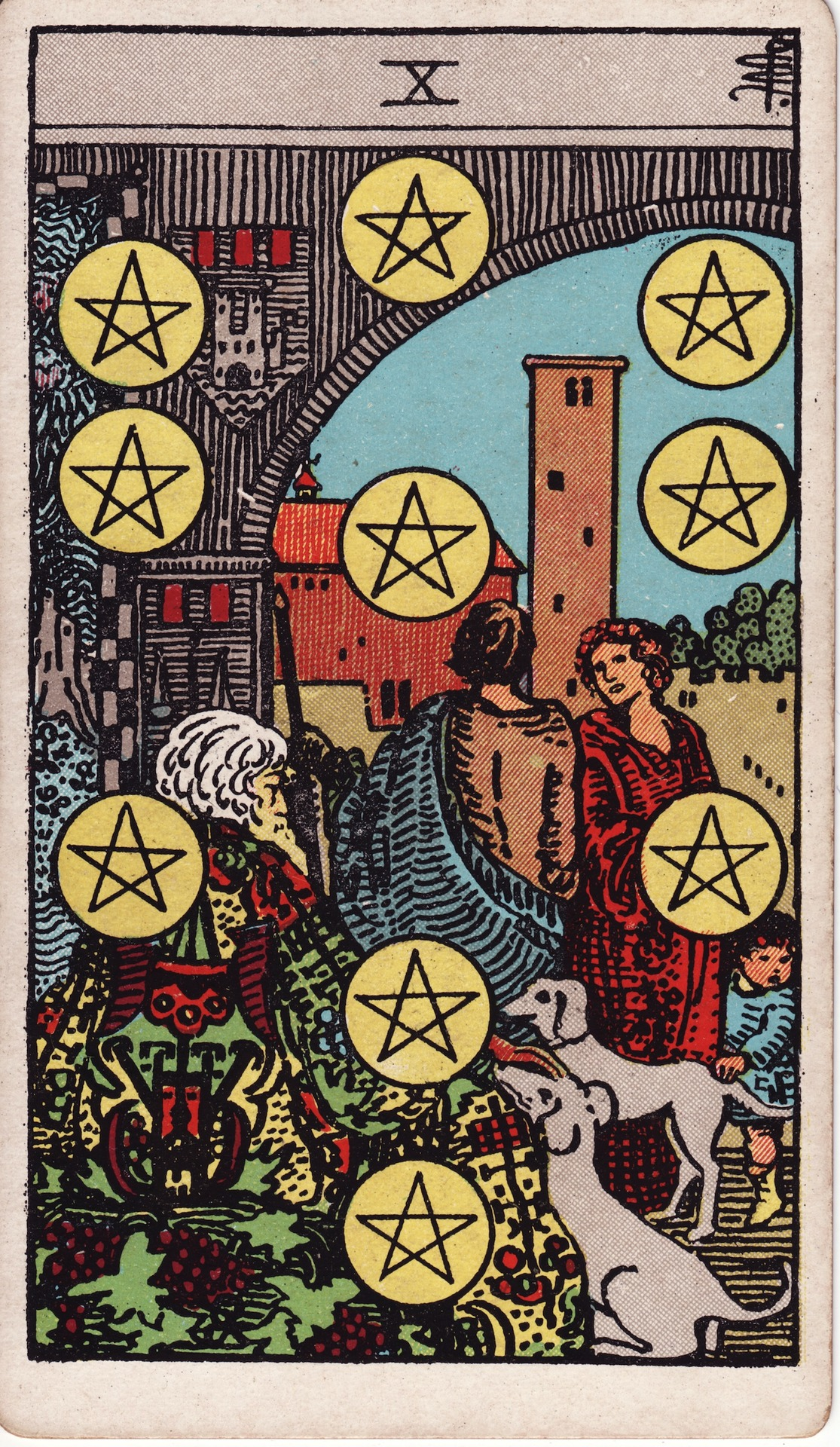
Ten of Coins

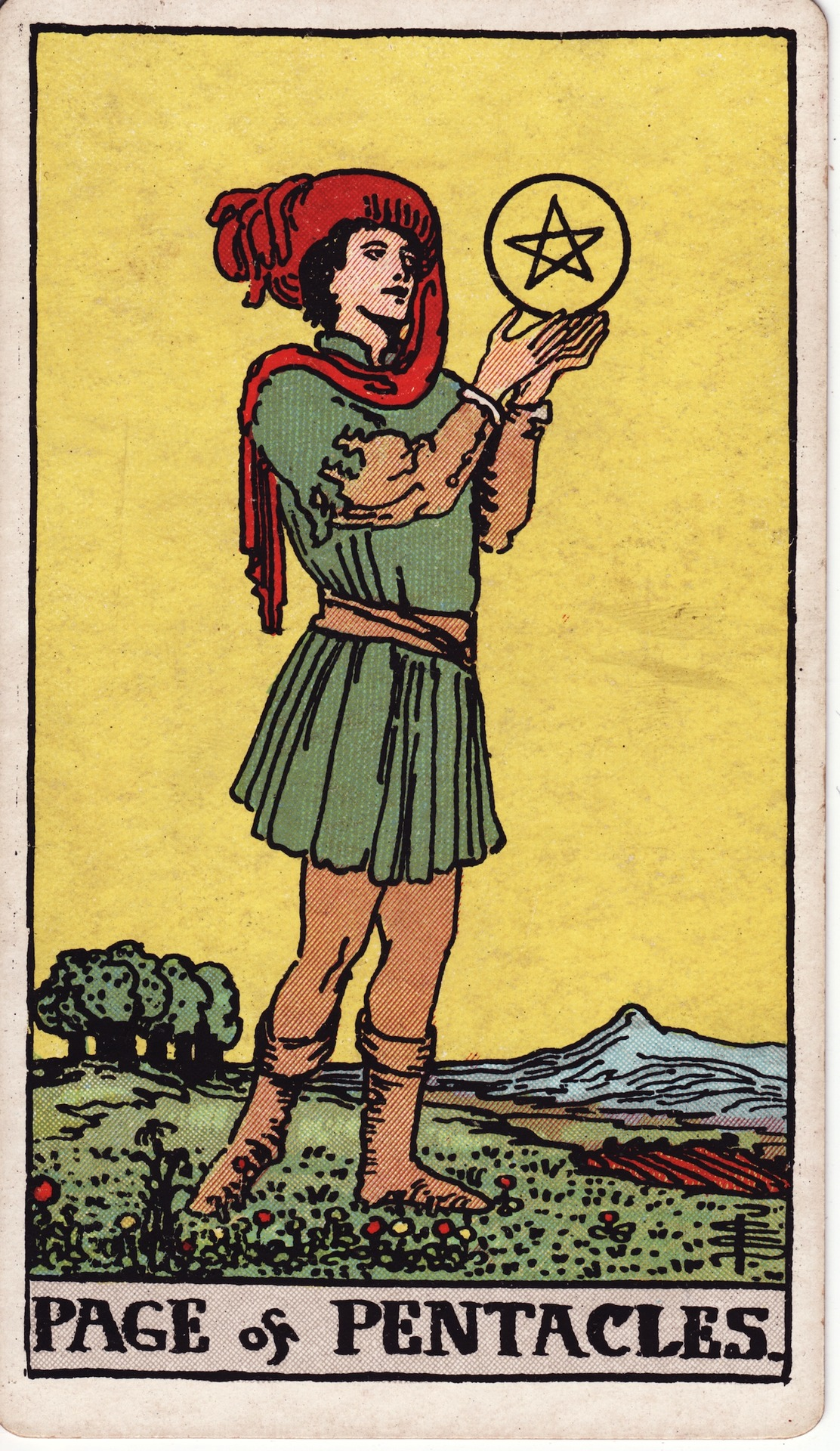
Page of Coins

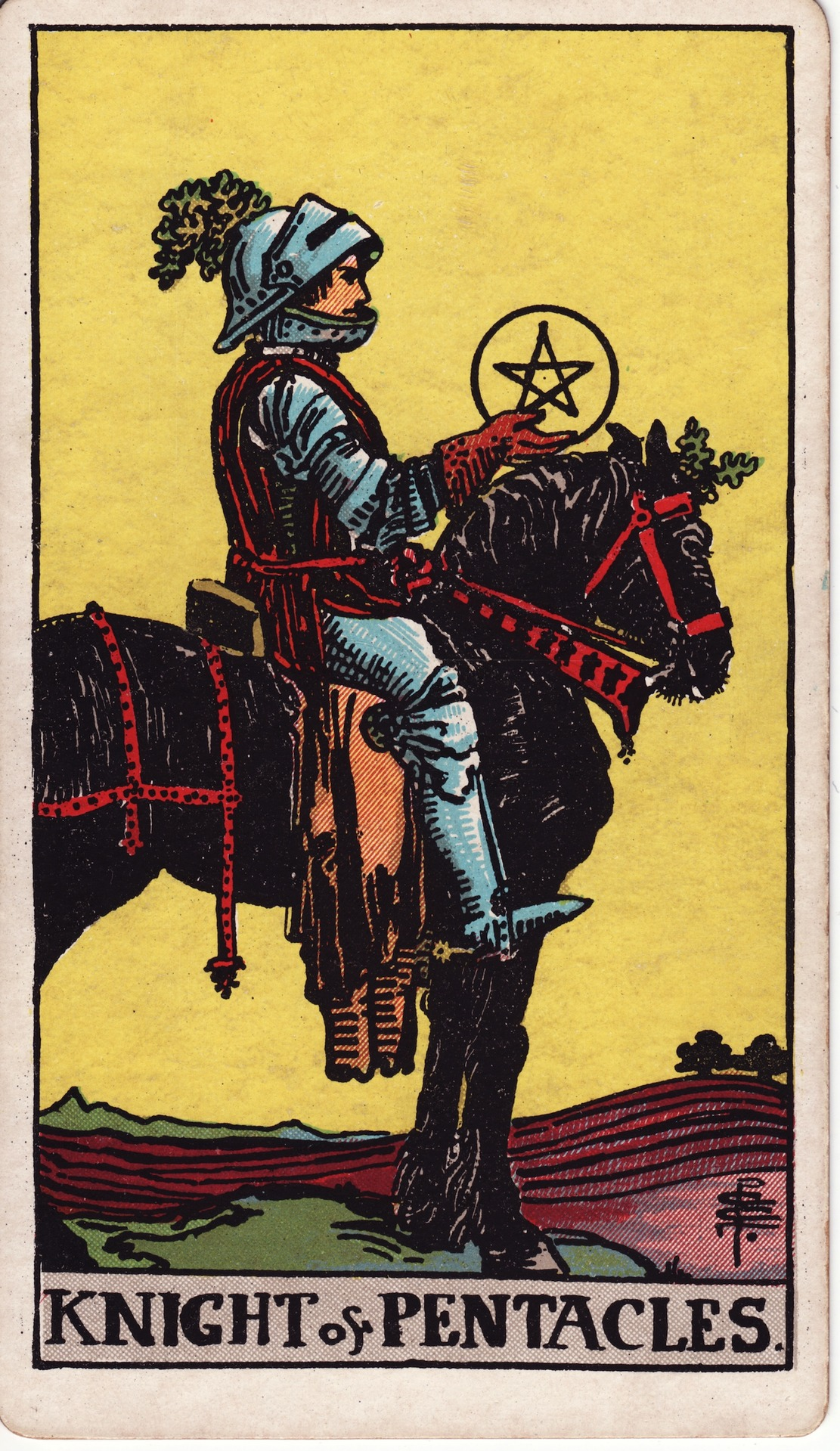
Knight of Coins

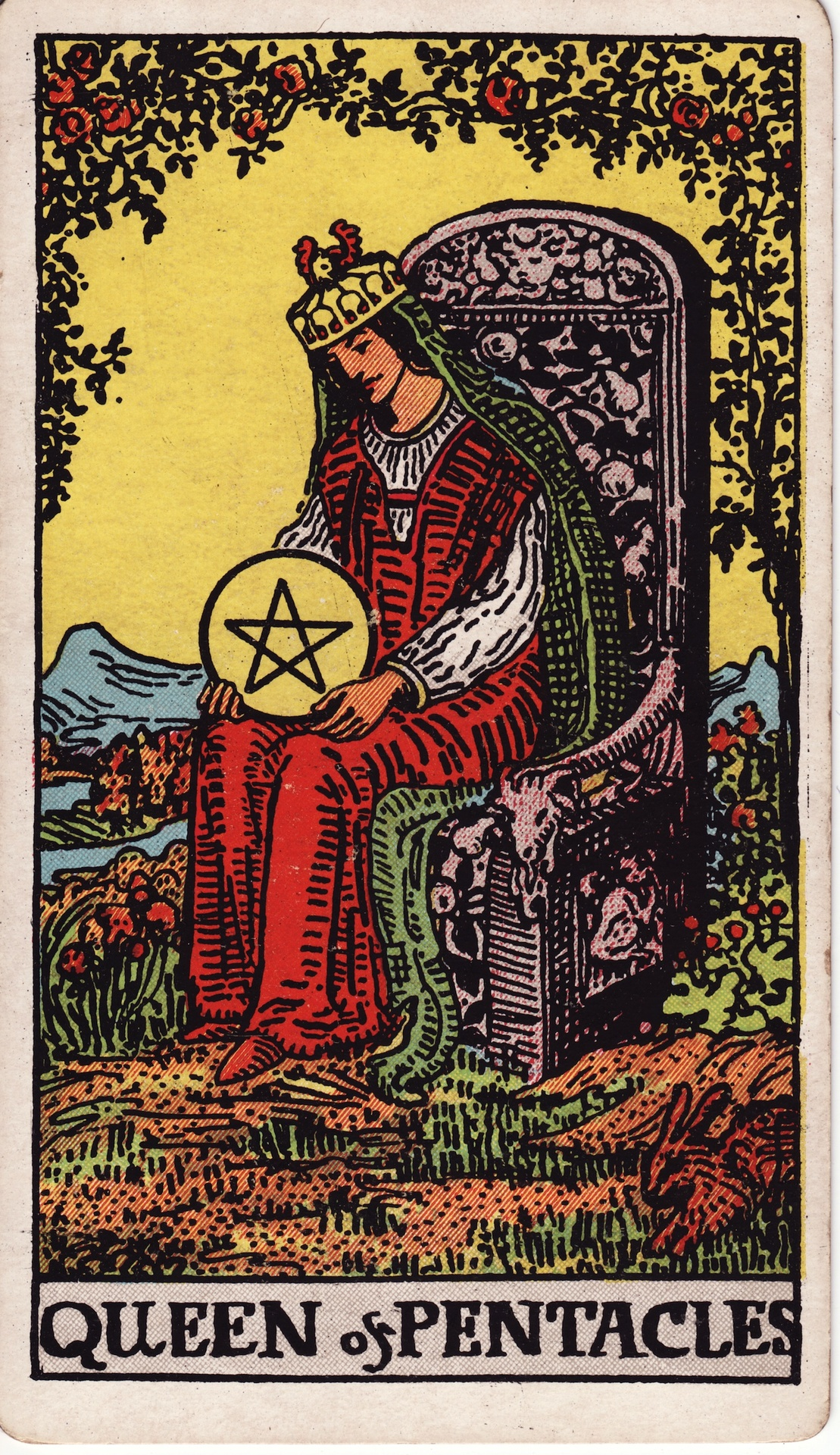
Queen of Coins

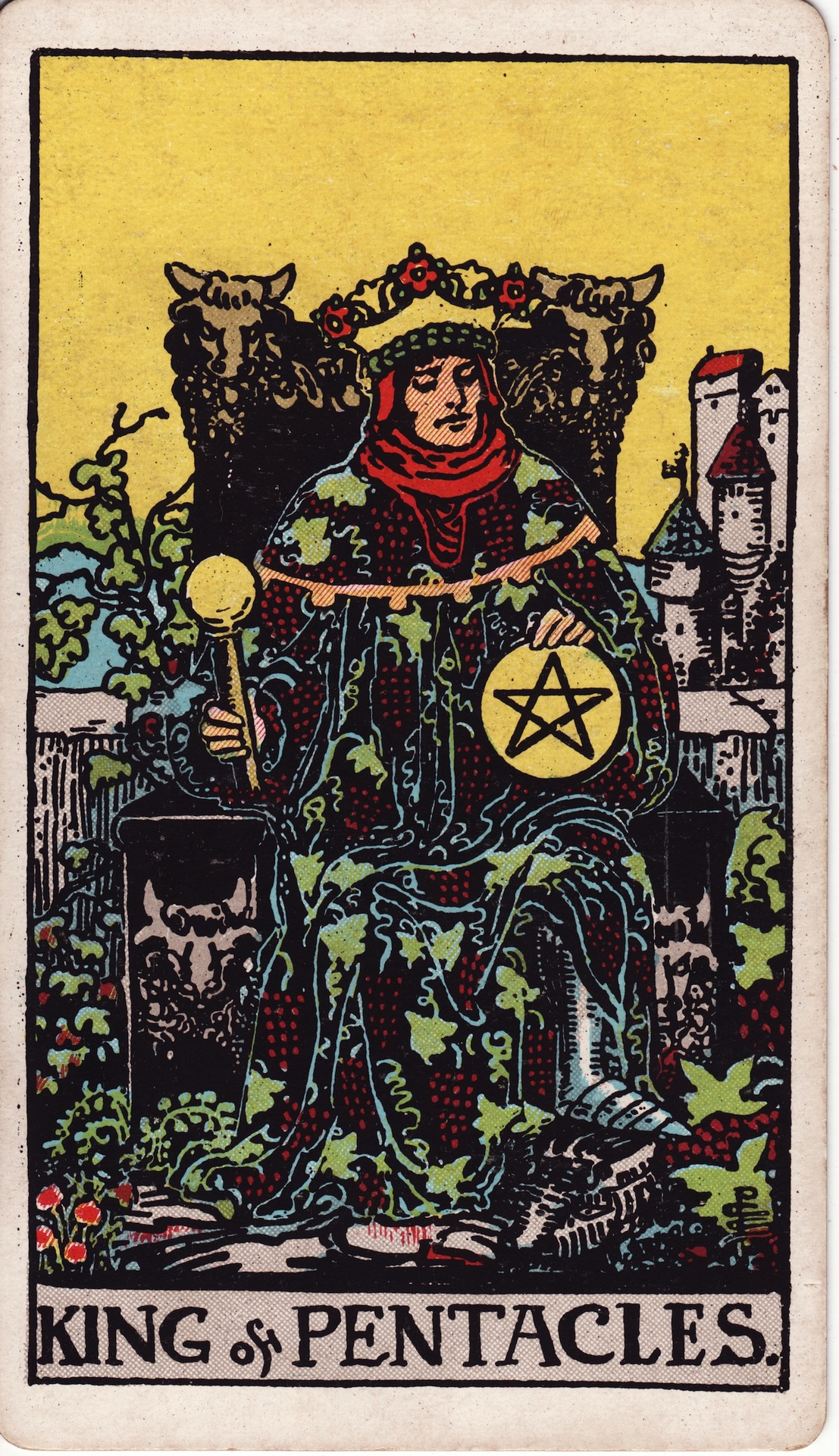
King of Coins

== See also ==
- Coins - suit of Latin (Italian/Spanish) playing cards
