= Coyne =

Coyne may refer to:

- Coyne (surname), a surname of Irish origin
- Coyne and livery, in Gaelic Ireland the free entertainment which a chief exacted from his subjects for his servants and followers
- Coyne, Churchtown, a townland in Churchtown civil parish, barony of Rathconrath, County Westmeath, Ireland
- Coyne College, an American for-profit college
- Coyne et Bellier, French consulting and engineering firm
- 14429 Coyne, a main-belt asteroid

== See also ==
- Coin (disambiguation)
