= Three of Coins =

Tarot card of the Minor Arcana

Three of Coins ("tre di denari") from an Italian deck

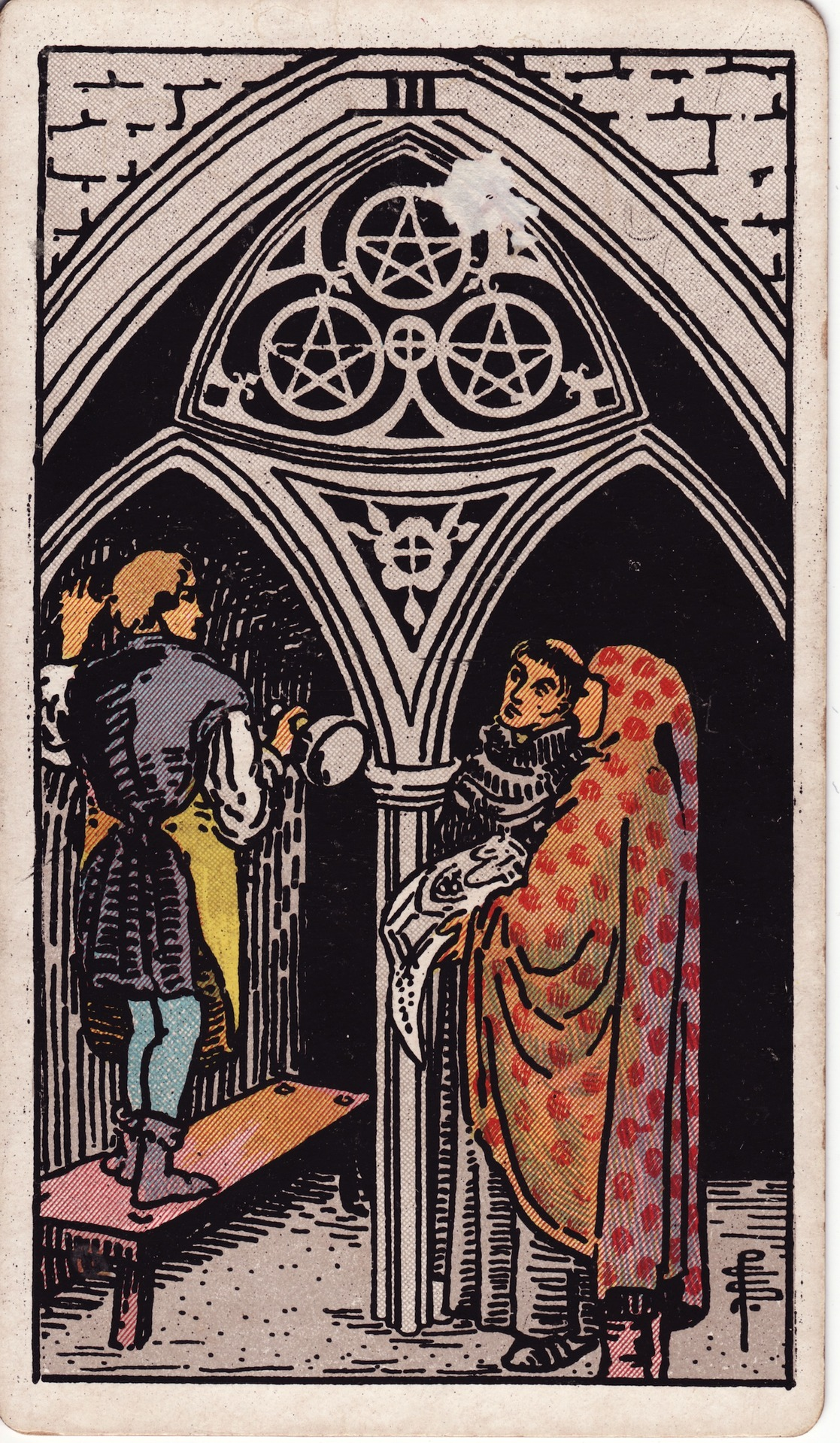
Three of Pentacles from the Rider–Waite tarot deck

The Three of Coins is the third card in the suit of coins. The suit is used in Spanish, Italian, and tarot decks.

In tarot, the Three of Coins (also called the Three of Pentacles) is part of what tarot card readers call the "Minor Arcana".

Tarot cards are used throughout much of Europe to play tarot card games. In English-speaking countries, where the games are largely unknown, tarot cards came to be utilized primarily for divinatory purposes.

== Key meanings ==
According to one source, these are five key meanings associated with the Three of Coins:

- Teamwork
- Skill development
- Commitment
- Achievement
- High standards

== Card reading ==
In tarot, positive attributes of the Three of Pentacles in a spread include the mastery of a skill in trade or work; achieving perfection; artistic ability; and dignity through renown rank or power. Negative attributes (when card is in reverse) include sloppiness resulting in a lower quality outcome; lack of skill; banal ideas; and preoccupation with off task concerns.

== Significant combinations with other cards ==
- Three of Pentacles and The Lovers – indicates collaborative efforts leading to meaningful work relationships. Harmony in partnership choices enhances creative ventures
- Three of Pentacles and The Emperor – suggests structure and mastery. Achieving success through discipline and strategic leadership in your professional life.
- Three of Pentacles and The Fool – this mix talks of new, exciting learning phases. Embracing fresh collaborations with an open heart and adventurous spirit.
- Three of Pentacles and the Eight of Pentacles - this mix stresses the importance of both teamwork and personal dedication in achieving mastery and success. It's about honing one’s craft while benefiting from the input and guidance of others.
- Three of Pentacles and the Ten of Pentacles - this mix highlights working together brings lasting security and success, often within the context of business or community ventures.
