= Coin, Missouri =

Extinct town in Missouri, US

Coordinates: 36°41′22″N 91°14′13″W

Coin is an extinct town in eastern Oregon County, in the U.S. state of Missouri. The village site was located in Bat Cave Hollow along the current Missouri Route FF.

A post office called Coin was established in 1895, and remained in operation until 1909. The community has the name of Coin Jones, an early settler.
