= Quoin (disambiguation) =

Quoins are masonry blocks at the corner of a wall.

Quoin or Du Quoin may also refer to:

== Places ==
- Quoin Bluff, Western Australia
- Quoin Hill Airfield, Vanuatu
- Du Quoin, Illinois, USA
  - Du Quoin station
  - Du Quoin State Fairgrounds
  - DuQuoin State Fairgrounds Racetrack

== Other ==
- Quoin (gunnery), a wedge used in aiming a cannon
- Quoin (printing), wooden or metal wedges or cam operated devices for locking printing type into a chase

== See also ==
- Quoin Island (disambiguation)
