= COIN =

COIN or COINS may refer to:

- Coin (band) (often stylized COIN), an American indie pop band
- COIN (board game), a series of asymmetric board games
- Coinbase (Nasdaq: COIN), a company which operates a cryptocurrency exchange
- Collaborative innovation network, innovative teams
- Community of interest network
- Combined Online Information System, a UK database containing HM Treasury's analysis of departmental spending
- ContextObjects in Spans (COinS), a specification for publishing OpenURL references in HTML
- Counter-insurgency
  - Counter-insurgency aircraft

== See also ==
- COIN-OR, the Computational Infrastructure for Operations Research project
- Coin (disambiguation)
