= Coining =

Coining may refer to:

- Coining (metalworking), a metalworking process
- Coining (mint), the production of coins
- Coining (traditional medicine), dermabrasion practiced in China, Indonesia, and Vietnam
- Coin counterfeiting
- Solder ball flattening
- The creation of a protologism or neologism

== See also ==
- Coin (disambiguation)
- Coinage (disambiguation)
