= Coinage =

Coinage may refer to:

- Coining (mint), the process of manufacturing coins
- COINage, an American magazine
- Tin coinage, an English tax on refined tin
- Coinage, a protologism or neologism

== See also ==
- Coin (disambiguation)
- Coining (disambiguation)
