= Coin, Nevada =

Unincorporated community in Nevada, US

Coordinates: 40°52′59″N 115°42′56″W

Coin is an unincorporated community in Elko County, in the U.S. state of Nevada.

== History ==
The first settlement at Coin was made about 1869.
