= King of Coins =

Tarot card of the Minor Arcana

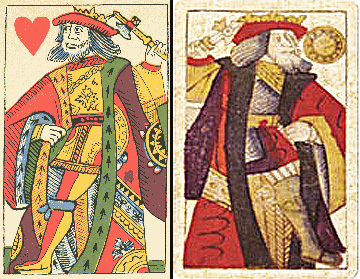
Comparison between King of Hearts and King of Coins

King of Coins is a card used in Latin-suited playing cards (Italian, Spanish, and tarot decks). It is the king from the suit of coins. In Tarot, it is part of what tarot card readers call the "Minor Arcana".

Tarot cards are used throughout much of Europe to play tarot card games. In English-speaking countries, where the games are largely unknown, tarot cards came to be utilized primarily for divinatory purposes.

The King of Coins depicts a mature man of considerable earthly power, usually depicted as a diplomatic business-man with a lot of practical wisdom. The king of pentacles can be miserly at times. He has a taste for sensual delights and earthly gifts. Here is a man who has a social standing and is big on keeping up with the Joneses. On the downside, he can be a man of phenomenally huge ego, the one whom the querent dare not cross. The card depicts a man who can help the querent grasp the social and practical knowledge that he needs to acquire wealth or respectability. As with the rest of the court cards, the appearance of this card may signify contact with a person of this high stature. It does not necessarily indicate material riches to the querant, unless this has been further supported by other cards. The Rider–Waite deck depicts a man sitting on a black throne adorned with a gold bull. Grapes appear on his clothes, and a castle is in the background.

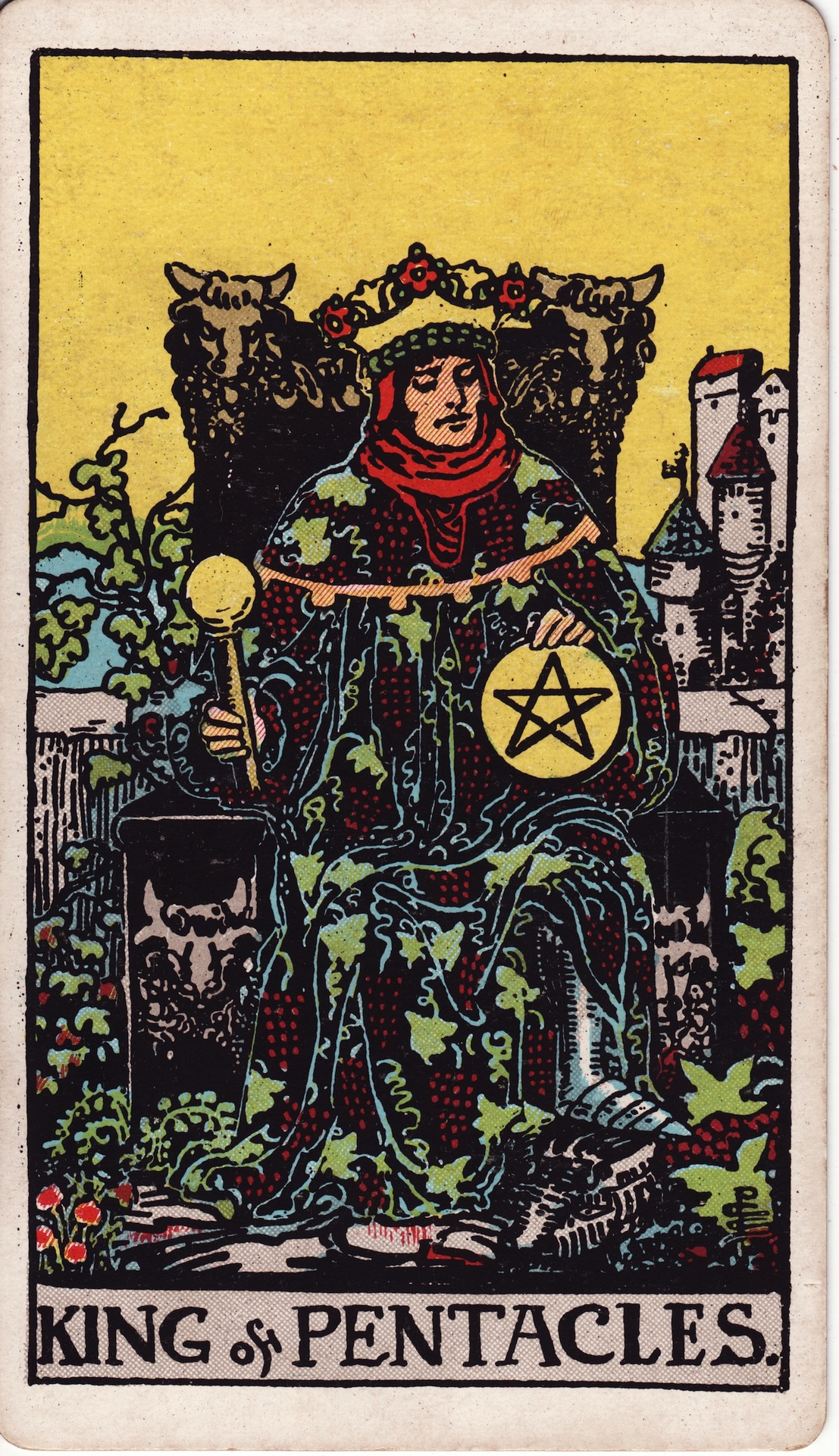
King of Coins from the Rider–Waite tarot deck
