= Queen of Coins =

Tarot card of the Minor Arcana

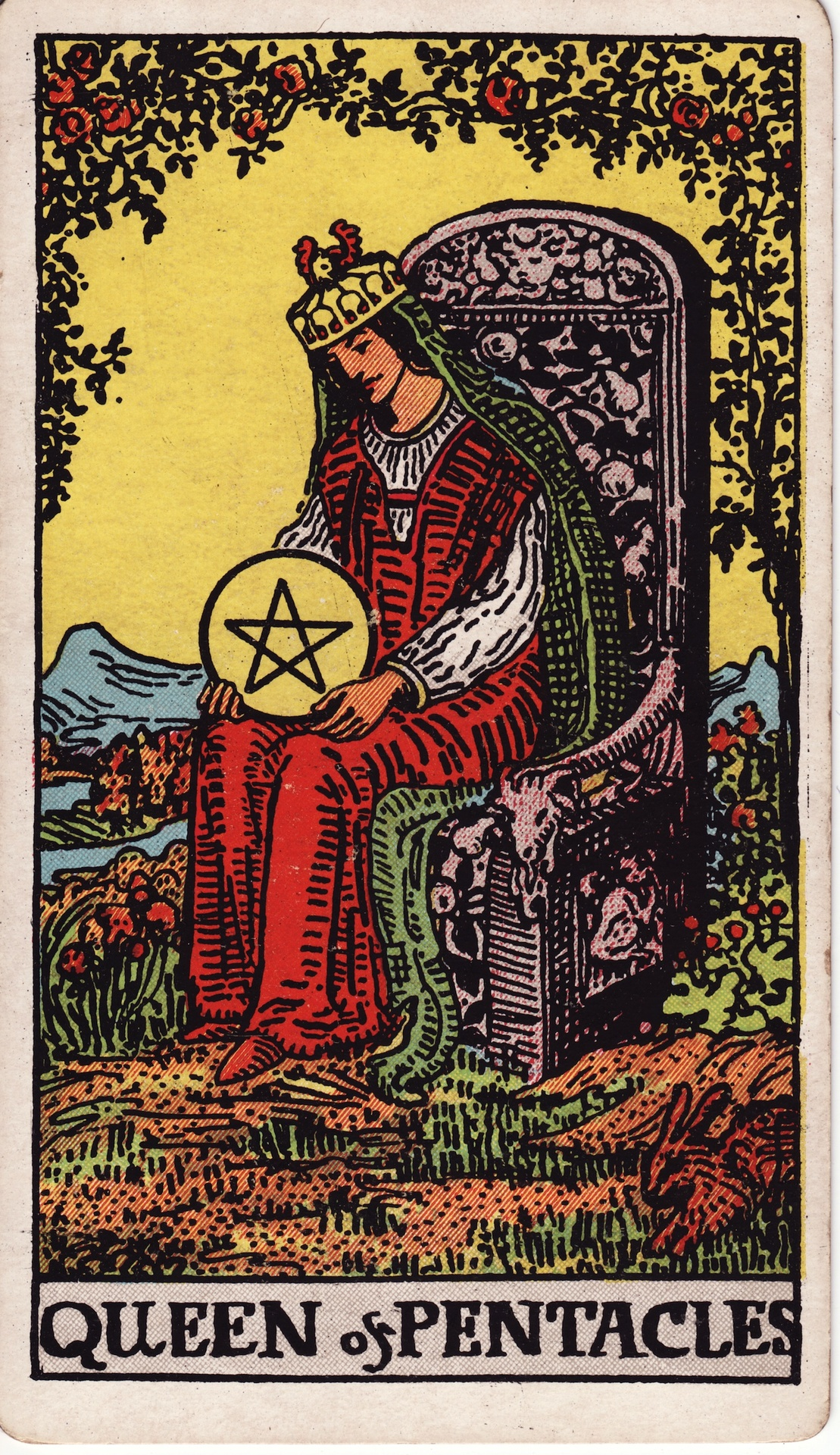
Queen of Coins from the Rider–Waite tarot deck

The Queen of Coins, also known as the Queen of Pentacles, is a card used in Latin-suited playing cards (Italian, Spanish, and tarot decks). It is the queen from the suit of coins. In tarot, it is part of what tarot card readers call the "Minor Arcana".

Tarot cards are used throughout much of Europe to play tarot card games. In English-speaking countries, where the games are largely unknown, tarot cards came to be utilized primarily for divinatory purposes.

== Divination usage ==
The upright queen of pentacles signifies someone down-to-earth, who takes responsibility for many roles in the care for her family. Representing a mature female or feminine presence, the receiver of the upright queen of pentacles has central focus on childcare and wellbeing. However, the Queen of Pentacles should not be mistaken as only a homebody and housewife. She has the ability to execute effective business strategies under tight time constraints. The Queen of Pentacles works her magic in the background, as she remains quiet about her accomplishments. Lastly, she desires a simple and minimalist lifestyle--she loves to be calculated, careful and vigilant.

The reversed queen of pentacles can become unattached from reality, leaving her completely self-centered. Some of her traits include being selfish and jealous when others show greater success. For the card drawer, the Queen of Pentacles indicates misplaced priorities and distractions from long-term goals. This card also indicates that those in the beholder's care are ready to be independent and responsible for their own lives. The beholder has reached a rewarding point where their loved ones are strong enough to make their own decisions. In order to return to her upright state, the queen of pentacles needs to become grounded again.
