= Page of Coins =

Tarot card of the Minor Arcana

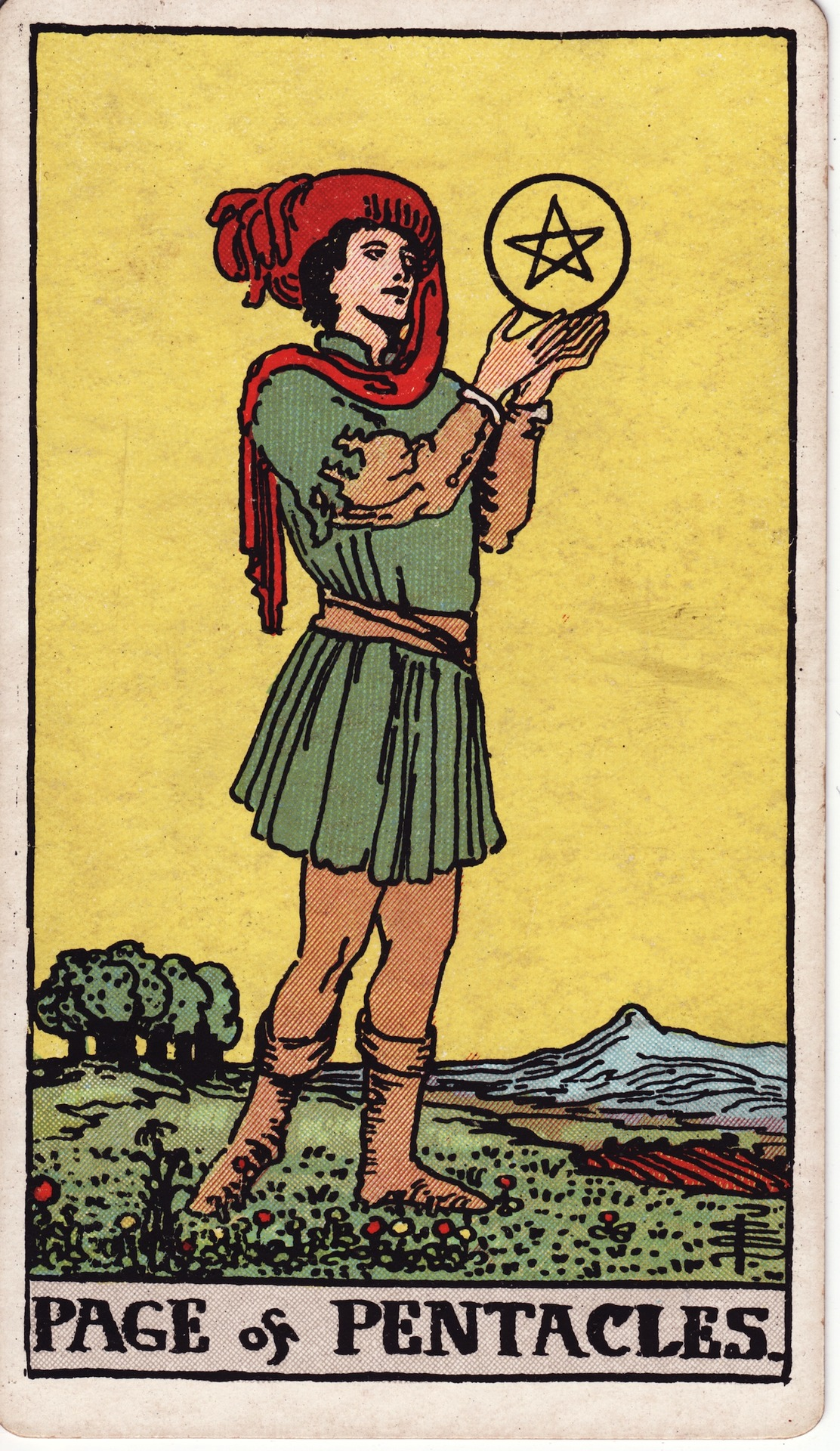
Page of Coins from the Rider–Waite tarot deck

Page of Coins (or jack or knave of coins or pentacles) is a card used in Latin-suited playing cards which include tarot decks. It is part of what tarot card readers call the "Minor Arcana". It is believed to provide hints about how to invest resources and turn ideas into reality.

Tarot cards are used throughout much of Europe to play tarot card games. In English-speaking countries, where the games are largely unknown, tarot cards came to be utilized primarily for divinatory purposes.

== Divination usage ==
Often used to represent a young person, in tarot the Jack of Coins can mean a changing of your line of work and/or taking on more responsibility. But primarily, this is the card for students.
