= Bat Cave Hollow =

Valley in Missouri, United States

Bat Cave Hollow is a valley in eastern Oregon County in the Ozarks of southern Missouri.

The intermittent stream in Bat Cave Hollow has headwaters at 36°42′36″N 91°17′13″W and its confluence with the Eleven Point River is at 36°40′59″N 91°11′50″W.

Bat Cave Hollow was named for Bat Cave which lies on the south bank of the stream and hosted a bat colony.
