= Coin (surname) =

Coin is a surname. Notable people with the surname include:

- Christophe Coin (born 1958), French cellist, viola da gamba player, and conductor
- Julie Coin (born 1982), French tennis player
- Robert Coin (1901–2007), French sculptor and engraver

== See also ==
- Coyne (surname)
