= Quoin Island =

Quoin Island may refer to:

- Quoin Island, Torres Strait North of Cape York Peninsula, Australia
- Quoin Island (Gladstone Harbour), Queensland, Australia
- As Salamah Archipelago (Quoin Islands), Oman
