= Knight of Coins =

Tarot card of the Minor Arcana

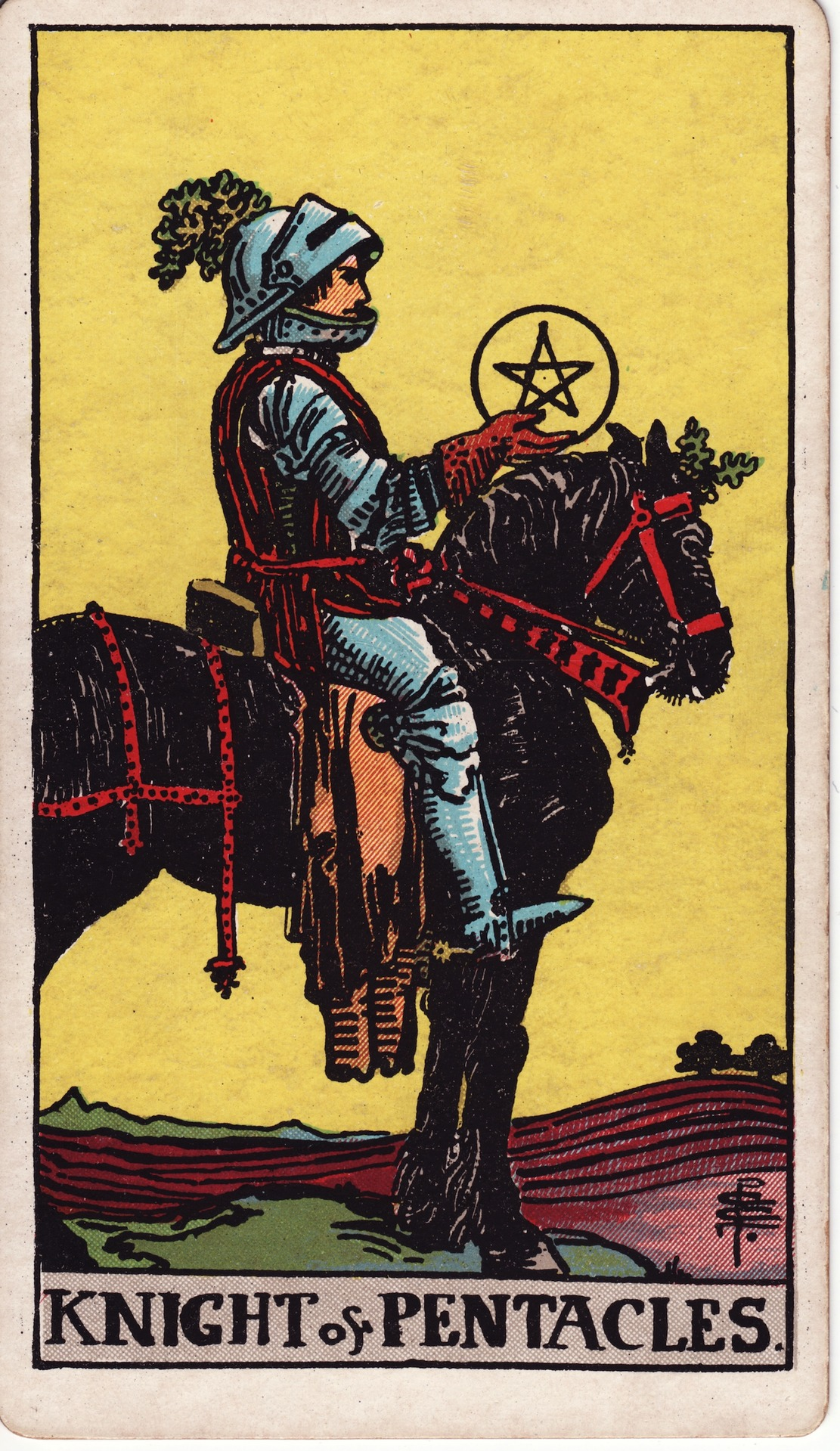
Knight of Coins from the Rider–Waite tarot deck

The Knight of Coins is a card used in Latin-suited playing cards which include tarot decks. It is part of what tarot card readers call the "Minor Arcana". The "coins" suit is sometimes referred to as "pentacles" or "discs" instead.

Tarot cards are used throughout much of Europe to play tarot card games. In English-speaking countries, where the games are largely unknown, tarot cards came to be utilized primarily for divinatory purposes.

== Divination usage ==
A knight is generally considered the appropriate card for a teenager or young adult, most often a teenaged boy or young man aged 18–30. Knights can also represent religion/philosophy or communication/logistics/action, although the horse on the Knight of Coins card is always standing still.

Coins are considered the "darkest" of the suits in terms of choosing based on appearance and are meant to represent dark-skinned, dark-haired people. Using this method, a Knight of Coins would be used to represent a young man who is dark of complexion and features.

One may also choose based on the meaning of the card, and how that meaning lines up with personality. So, in the case of the Knight of Coins, the card might represent someone who is stubborn or hard-working, serious, or set in their ways. One might also use this card when grappling with a question where one of those issues is coming up—when one has a question about work or home life, or a question about whether to stand one's ground on an issue.

The Knight of Coins is sometimes also interpreted as a "handsome brooding introvert".
