= Six of Coins =

Tarot card of the Minor Arcana

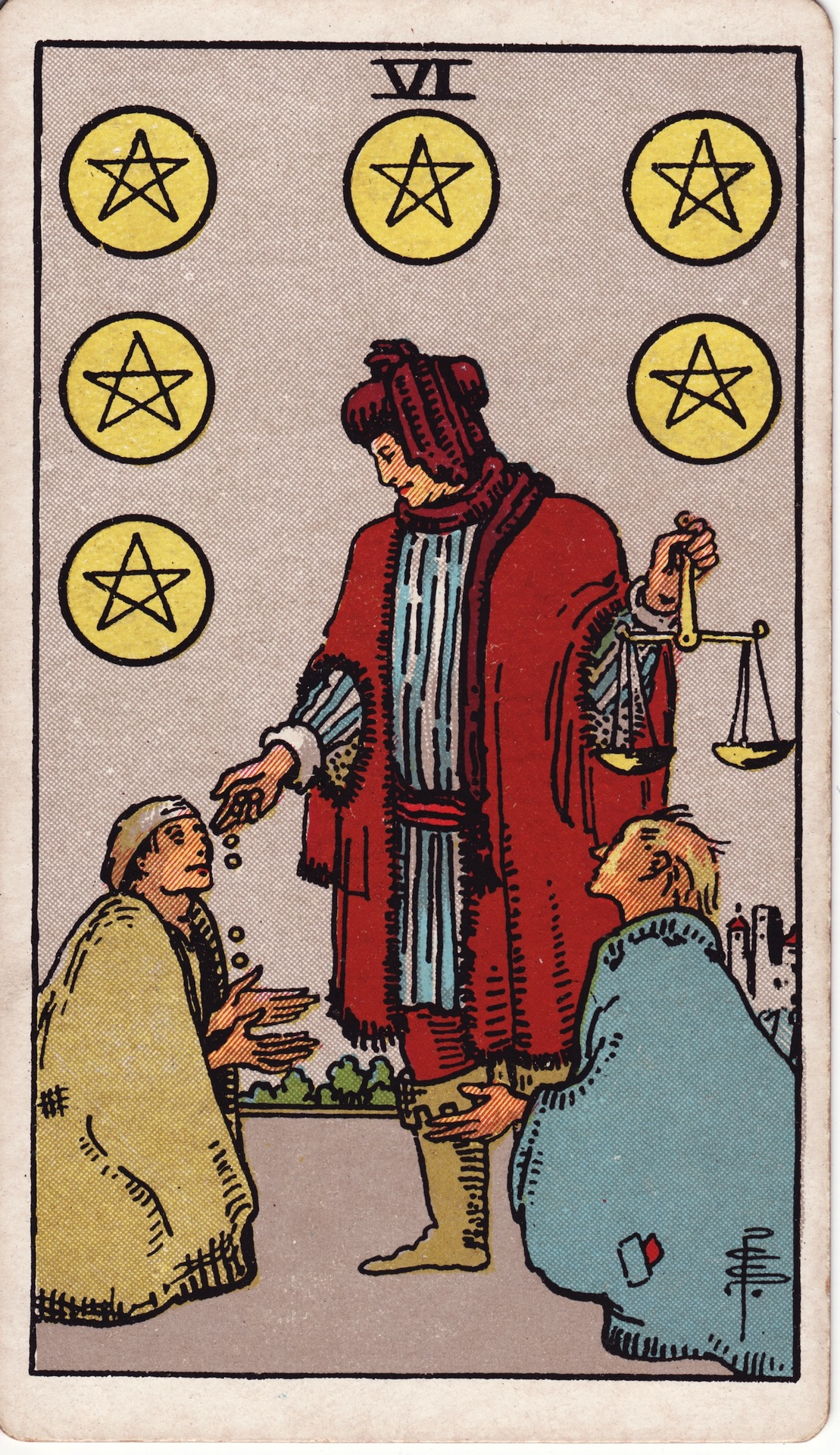
Six of Pentacles from the Rider–Waite tarot deck

The Six of Coins, or Six of Pentacles, is a card used in Latin-suited playing cards which include tarot decks. It is part of what tarot card readers call the "Minor Arcana".

Tarot cards are used throughout much of Europe to play tarot card games. In English-speaking countries, where the games are largely unknown, tarot cards came to be utilized primarily for divinatory purposes.

== Divination usage ==
A merchant weighs money in a pair of scales and distributes it to the needy and distressed, signifying the redistribution of wealth and gratification. This card also questions the motives of charity, and the inherent power dynamics, for example the societal expectations on recipients to be "grateful" and behave accordingly. It also raises the question of who benefits from charity, is it the recipient or the giver? The scales are symbolic of a balance or imbalance, in the distribution of wealth, resources and power, which can also be interpreted as pointing to the balances or imbalances in personal relationships.

Reversed, the card represents desire, cupidity, envy, jealousy and illusion.
