= Five of Coins =

Minor Arcana Tarot Card

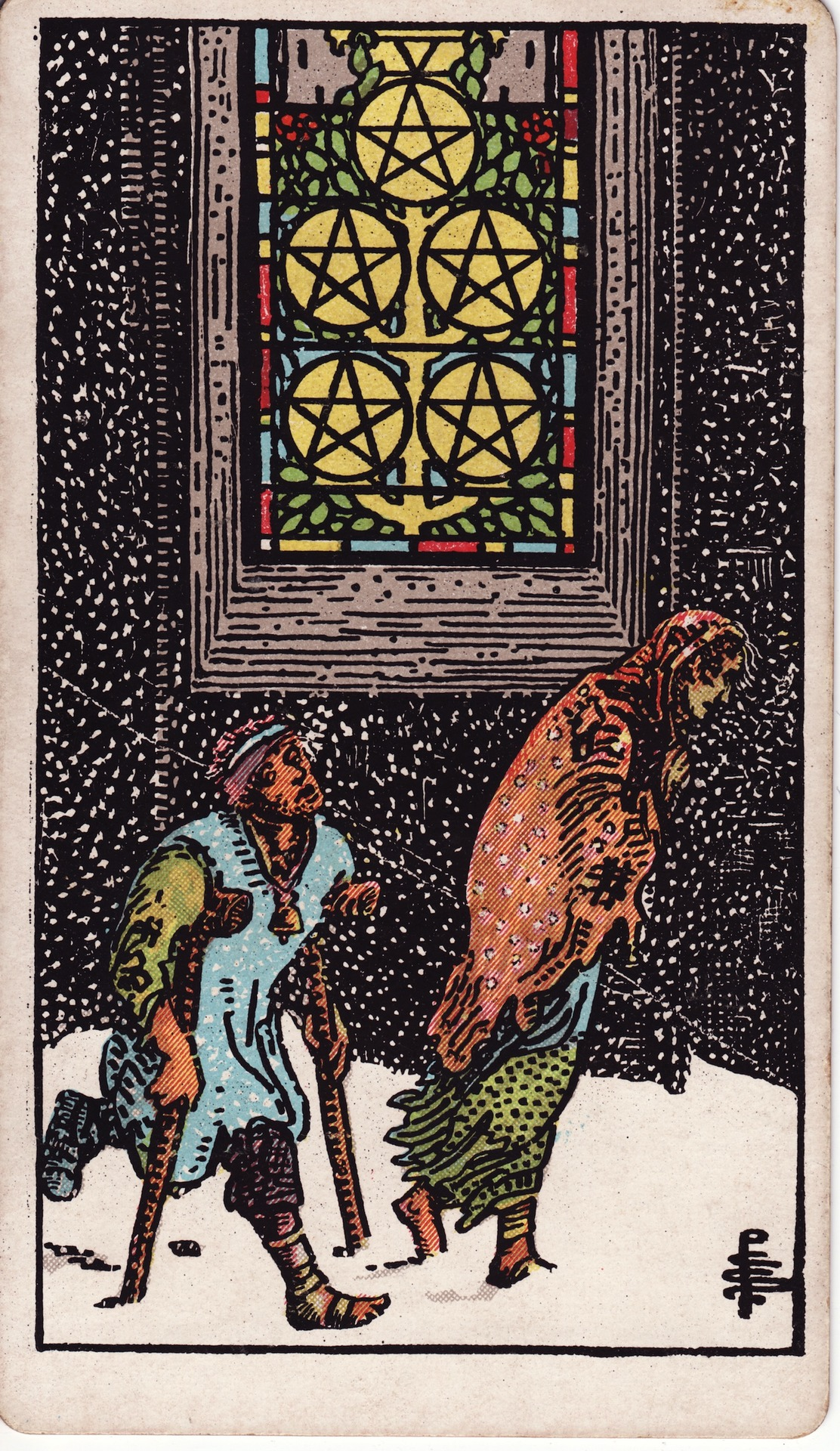
Five of Coins from the Rider–Waite tarot deck

Five of Coins is a card used in Latin-suited playing cards which include tarot decks. It is part of what tarot card readers call the "Minor Arcana".

Tarot cards are used throughout much of Europe to play tarot card games. In English-speaking countries, where the games are largely unknown, tarot cards came to be utilized primarily for divinatory purposes.

== Description ==
Two beggars under poverty, one of them in crutches, walk through the snow. Behind them sits a church with a window mosaic of pentacles.

== Divination usage ==
The card foretells material trouble above all, whether in the form illustrated—that is, destitution—or otherwise. For some cartomancists, it is a card of love and lovers—wife, husband, friend, mistress; also concordance, affinities. These alternatives cannot be harmonized.

Reversed: Disorder, chaos, ruin, discord, profligacy.
