= Ten of Coins =

Tarot card of the Minor Arcana

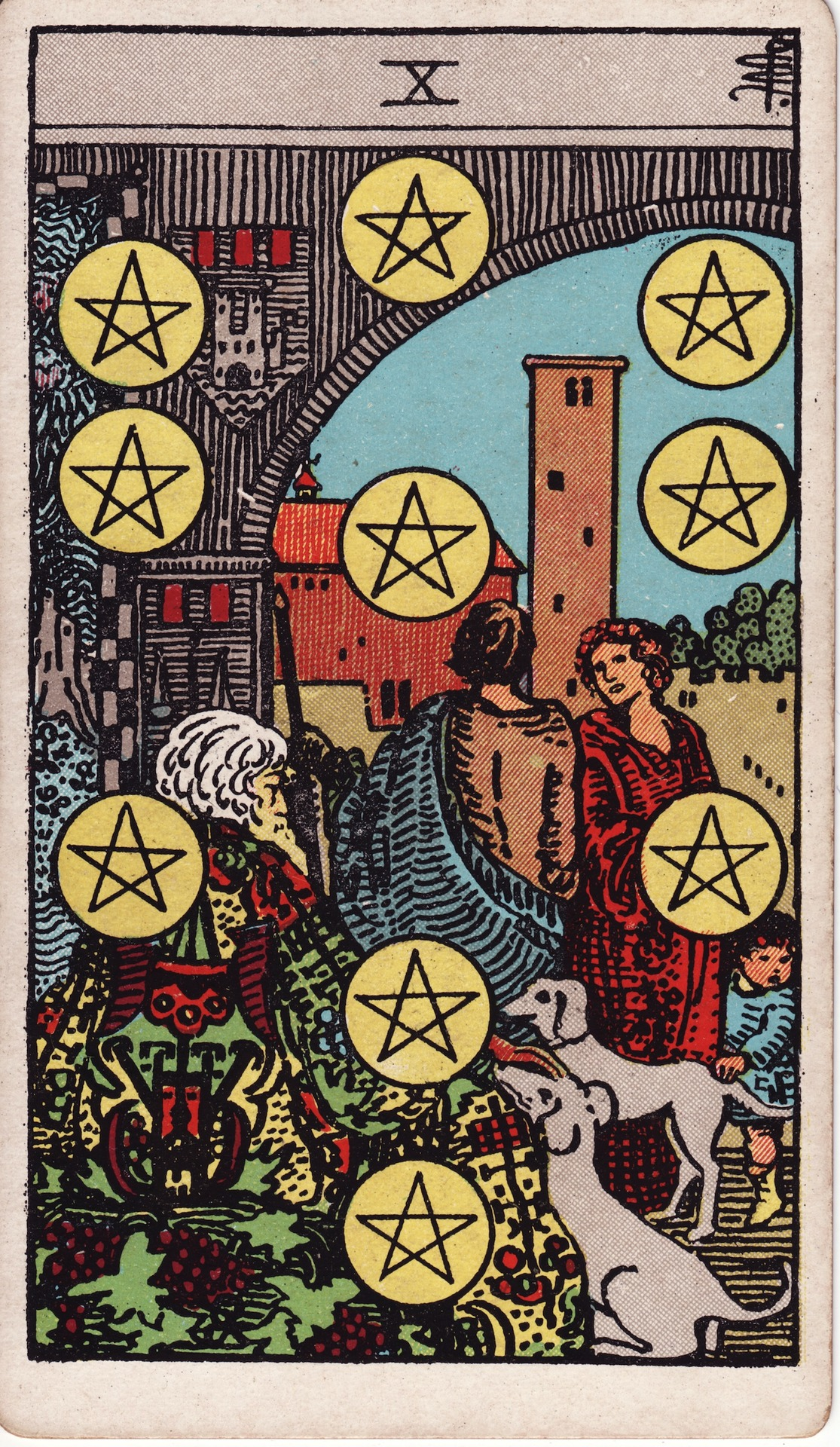
Ten of Coins from the Rider–Waite tarot deck

Ten of Coins is the tenth card in the suit of coins, mostly in Tarot decks. It is parallel to the Ten of Diamonds in playing cards. The suit is often called Pentacles, or sometimes Disks. This card is used in game playing as well as in divination. In divination, it is considered part of the Minor Arcana.

== Rider–Waite symbolism ==
- The coins in the front are ordered according to the structure of the kabbalistic Tree of Life.
- A man in the background seems to be guarding the old man - it is discernible he is holding a spear. As such he may be considered "at work".
- A woman, possibly the mother of the child, is talking to the man.

== Divination usage ==
It is often associated with family matters, financial matters or a mix of the two. Some sources associate it with affluence or even riches. It may reflect a working environment.

== In other decks ==
In the Thoth Tarot deck this card is labeled Wealth, and is associated with the third decan of Virgo, said to be ruled by Mercury.
