= Seven of Coins =

Tarot card of the Minor Arcana

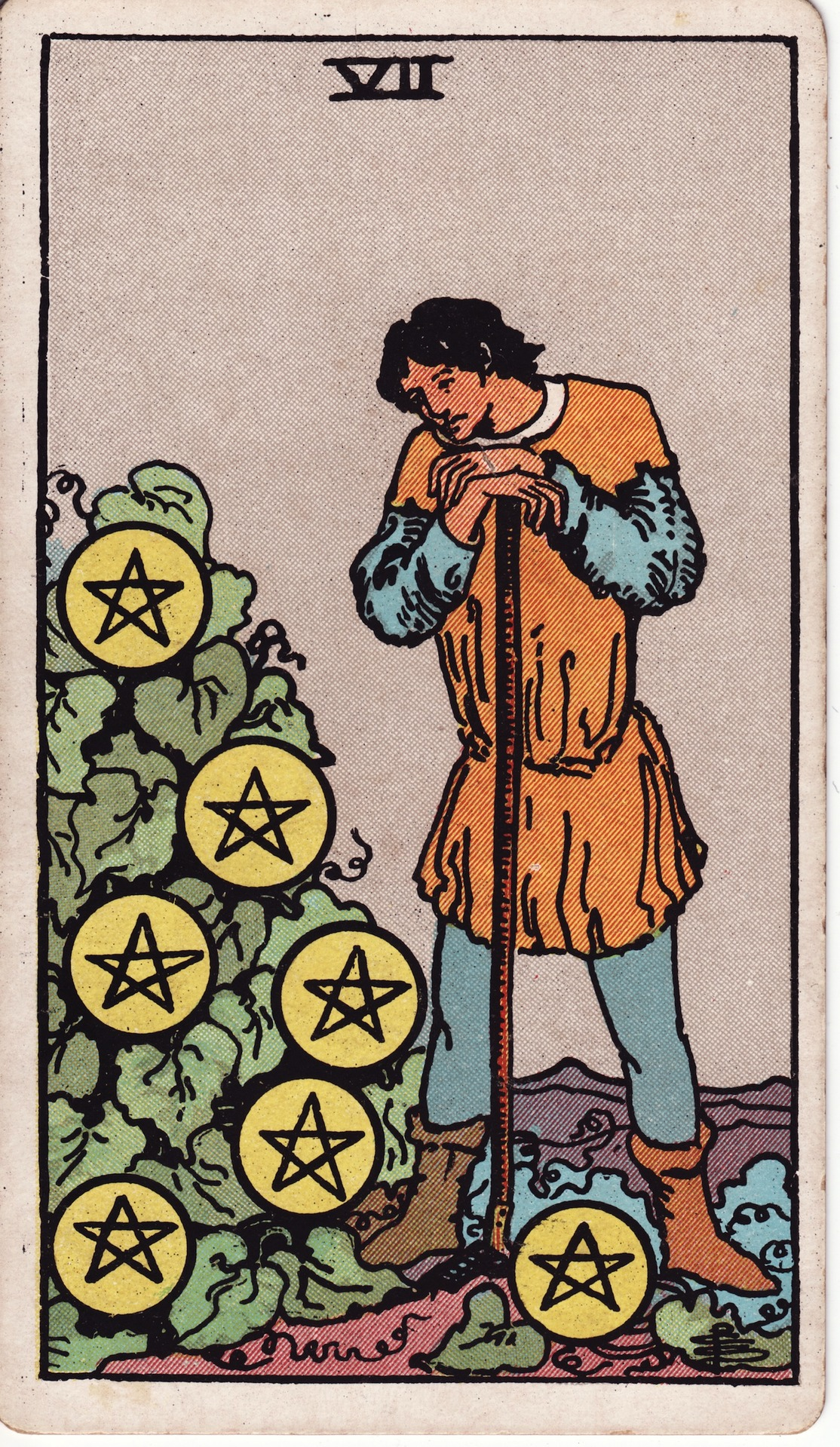
Seven of Coins from the Rider–Waite tarot deck

The Seven of Coins or Seven of Pentacles is a card used in Latin-suited playing cards which include tarot decks. It is part of what tarot card readers call the "Minor Arcana".

Tarot cards are used throughout much of Europe to play tarot card games. In English-speaking countries, where the games are largely unknown, tarot cards came to be utilized primarily for divinatory purposes.

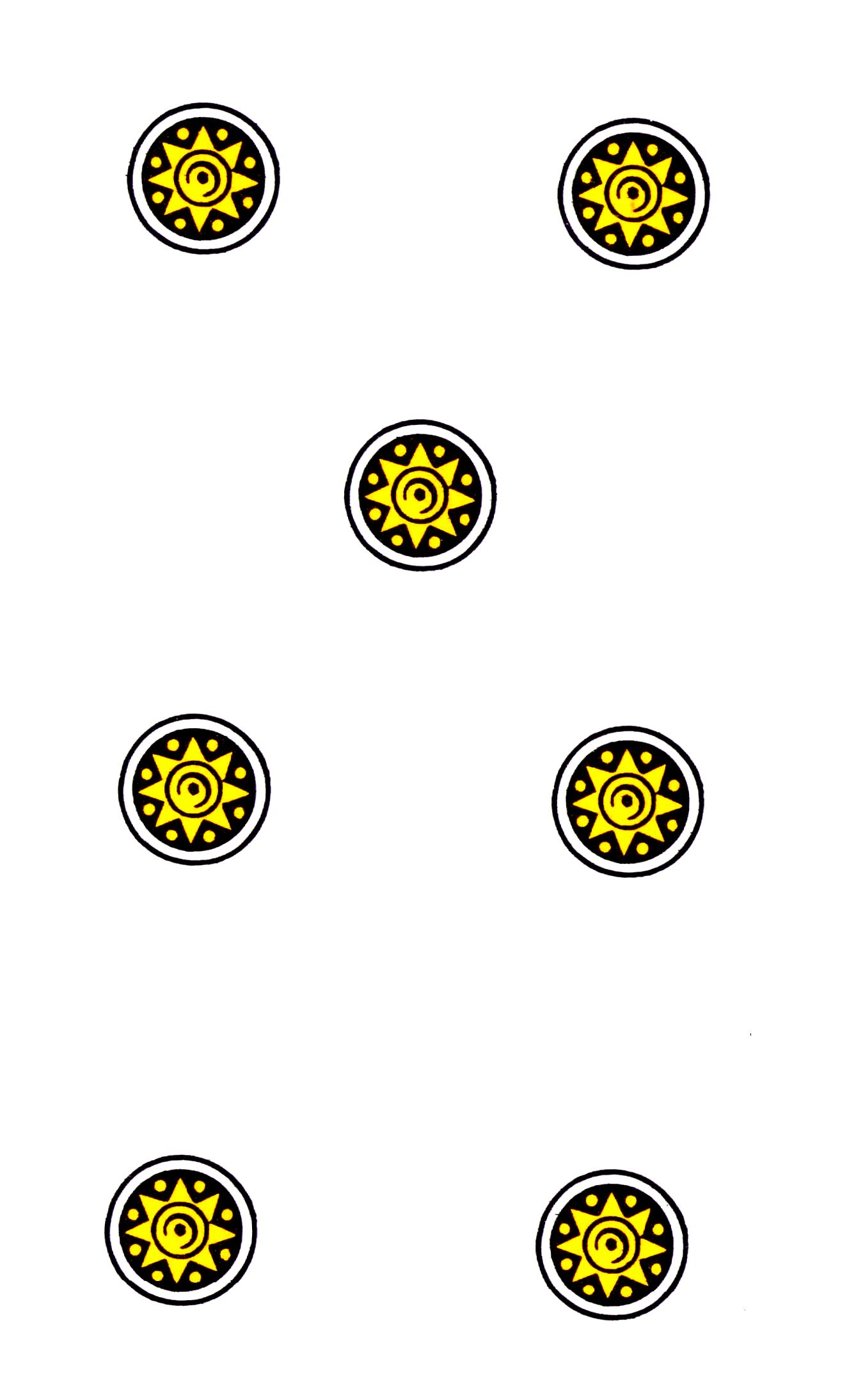
The sette bello in scopa

The seven of coins is the most valuable individual card in Italy's national game of scopa. Known as the sette bello ("beautiful seven"), capturing it is one of four achievements that earns a game point.

== Interpretation for divination ==
The Seven of Coins can mean movement, either moving house or moving up in a career. When upright, it shows commitment to work life or dreams.

Reversed, it signal excess energy and personal resource strain, the feeling of giving too much for too little reward or assurance of moving forward. It advises reassessment of commitment levels, especially during a bad investment of time and/or money.

== In popular culture ==
In Italy, the playing card inspired the name for the Settebello (train), which inspired the name for Sette Bello, the racehorse. The card inspired the nickname of Italy men's national water polo team.

In her poem The Seven of Pentacles, Marge Piercy writes:

Under a sky the color of pea soup
she is looking at her work growing away there
actively, thickly like grapevines or pole beans
as things grow in the real world, slowly enough.
If you tend them properly, if you mulch, if you water,
if you provide birds that eat insects a home and winter food,
if the sun shines and you pick off caterpillars,
if the praying mantis comes and the ladybugs and the bees,
then the plants flourish, but at their own internal clock.
