= Nine of Coins =

Tarot card of the Minor Arcana

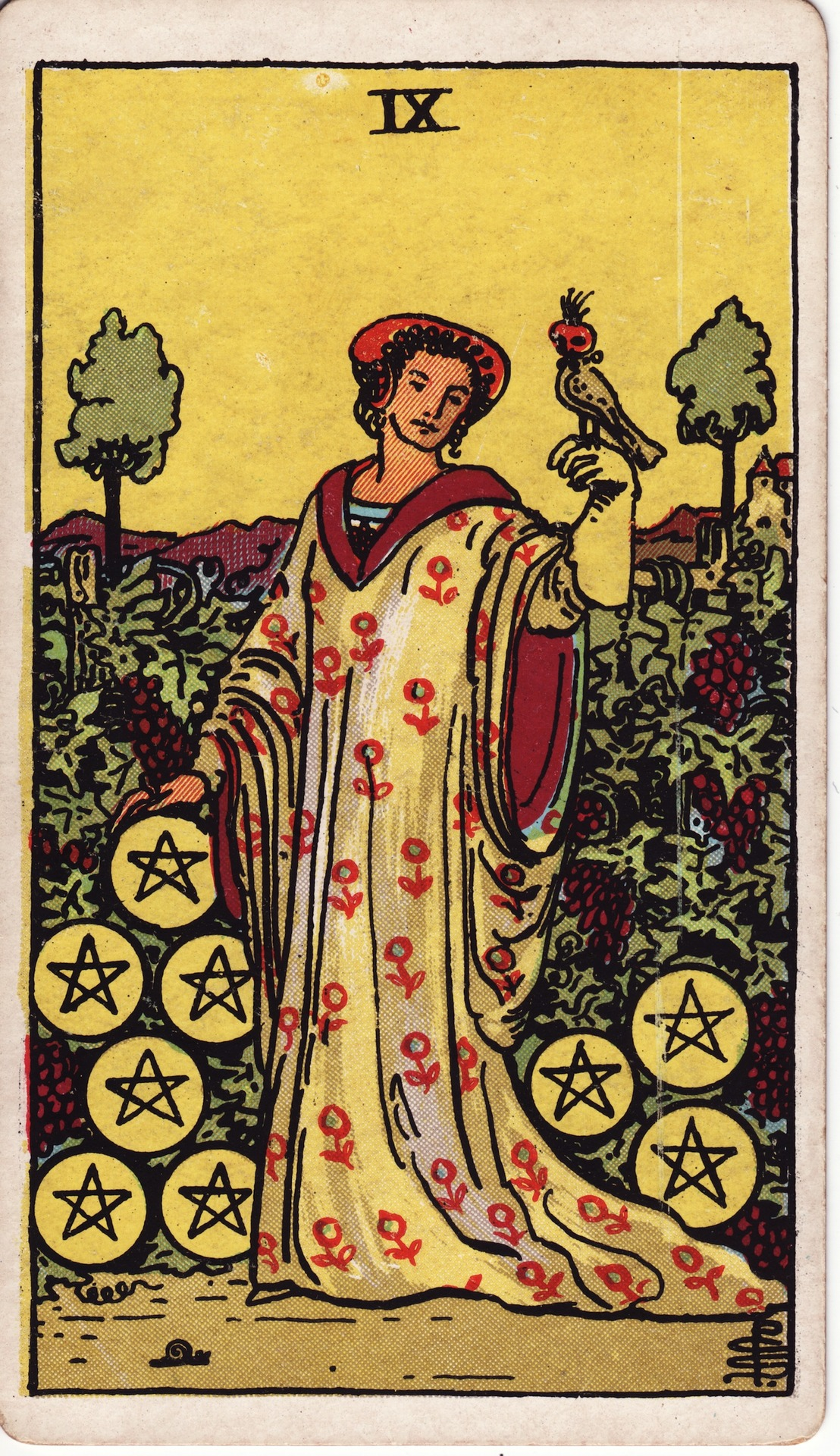
Nine of Coins from the Rider–Waite tarot deck

Nine of Coins is a card used in Latin-suited playing cards which include tarot decks. It is part of what tarot card readers call the "Minor Arcana" and represents a financially independent aristocrat.

Tarot cards are used throughout much of Europe to play tarot card games. In English-speaking countries, where the games are largely unknown, tarot cards came to be utilized primarily for divinatory purposes.

== Rider–Waite symbolism ==
The woman is surrounded by an abundance of grapevines on a large estate, most likely representing a fine material status. Her lofty demeanor is almost aristocratic and she may reflect a bourgeois personality.

Her facial expression is neutral. This inscrutability may be interpreted positively or negatively. On the one hand, she accepts her abundance of comforts; on the other, it does not show any enthusiasm for it. In Rider–Waite, this may testify to her strong perfectionistic demeanor and difficulty finding satisfaction.

Her robe is decorated with flowers, which may testify to the refinement of her senses. A hooded falcon rests at ease on her arm, again pointing to her aristocratic upbringing and complacent ignorance of the world beyond her garden. A young snail, denoted by a blue shell, makes its way across her path.

== Common interpretation ==
The Nine of Coins, or the Nine of Pentacles is a card when upright means having the financial independence, having the self-reliance of personal pursuits, the ability to treat yourself with luxury, being on a stable financial plateau and steady security.

Reversed, the card means excess spending, being co-dependent on your financials or on others, to feel lonely in your personal pursuits, to feel inadequate financially, to have everything money can buy but yet still feeling impoverished emotionally and spiritually. The advice of the card is to look within the root of your existing problems, to look and focus on what will make you feel complete and secure, yet to learn and grow along the way.
