= Ace of Coins =

Tarot card of the Minor Arcana

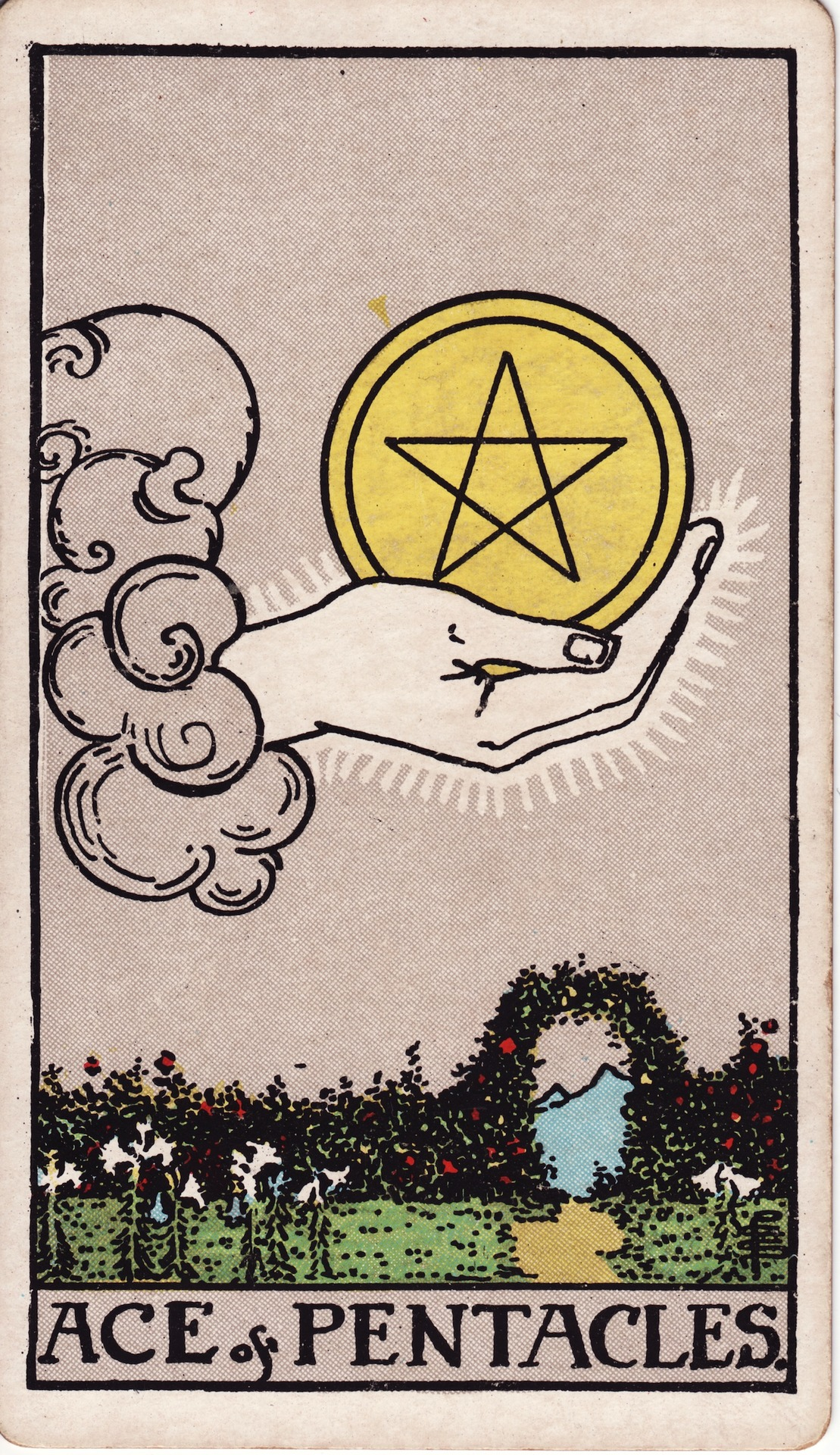
Ace of Coins from the Rider–Waite tarot deck

Ace of Coins is a card used in Latin-suited playing cards, which include tarot decks. Tarot card readers call the coins suit "Pentacles," and include this card in their "Minor Arcana."

Tarot cards are used throughout much of Europe to play tarot card games. In English-speaking countries, where the games are largely unknown, tarot cards came to be utilized primarily for divinatory purposes. If based on the Rider–Waite tarot deck, the Ace of coins symbolizes that it is time to move forward with one's career or financial ambitions, and it will require hard work and determination.

In many tarot games, the ranks of the pip cards in the coins (suit) are in reverse order making the Ace of coins rank higher than the Two of coins, but lower than the court cards. This also features in many other early card games like Madiao, Ganjifa, Ombre, and Maw (card game).

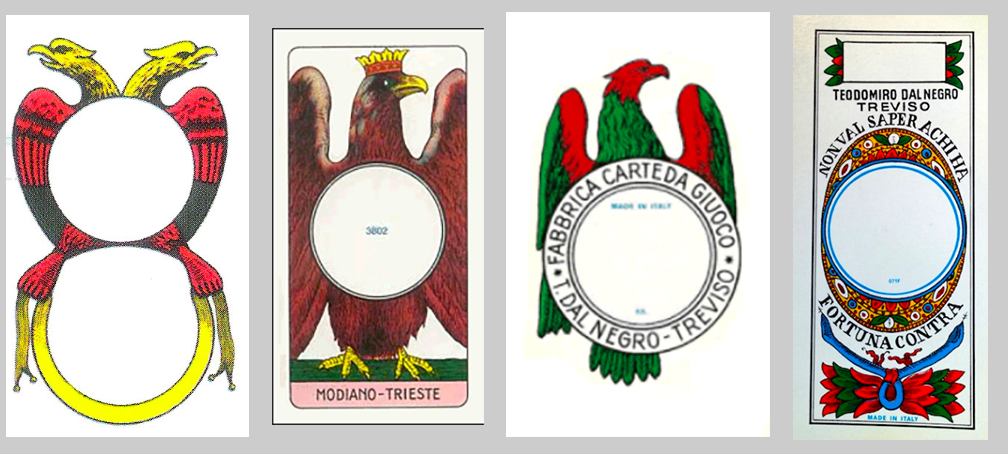
Ace of Coins from different regional Italian decks: Napoletane, Piacentine, Siciliane, Trevigiane

In some Italian-suited playing cards, the Ace of coins is represented by an eagle. Similar to the Ace of spades, it often has a more ornate design due to it being used for the stamp tax. The Ace of coins was dropped in the Tarocco Siciliano when it was shortened from 78 cards to 63 cards for three-handed games during the 18th century, but it was readded later for the sole purpose of the stamp tax.

Historical Portuguese-suited playing cards featured dragons on their aces, which can be seen on its descendant Komatsufuda's Ace of coins.

Dragons on the Ace of Coins
19th-century Portuguese-suited	Komatsufuda
Real Fabrica Ace of coins	Komatsufuda Ace of coins
