= Four of Coins =

Tarot card of the Minor Arcana

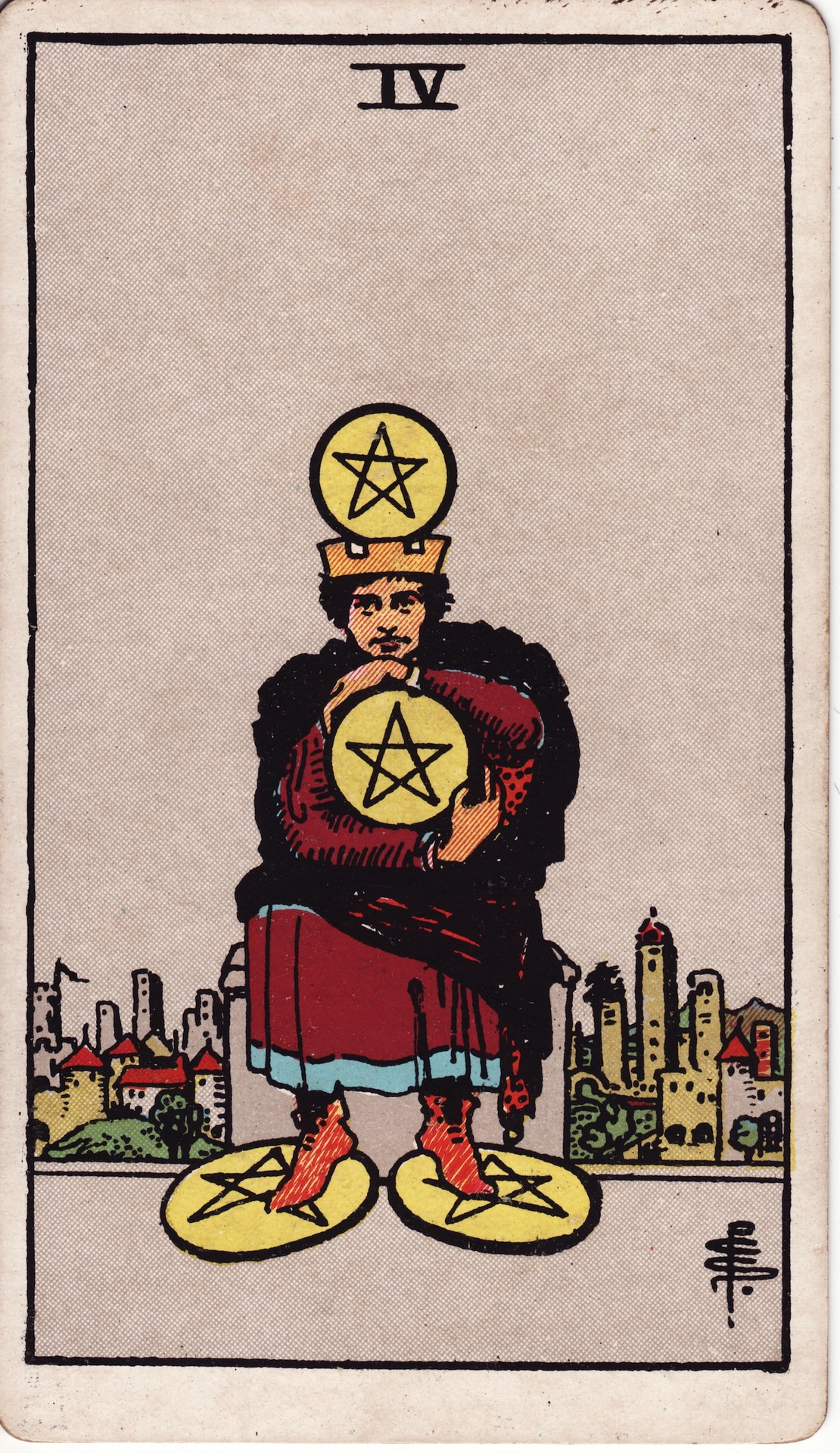
Four of Coins from the Rider–Waite tarot deck

Four of Coins (also known as the Four of Pentacles) is a card used in Latin-suited playing cards, which include tarot decks. It is part of what tarot card readers call the "Minor Arcana".

Tarot cards are used throughout much of Europe to play tarot card games. In English-speaking countries, where the games are largely unknown, tarot cards came to be utilized primarily for divinatory purposes.

== Divination usage ==
A spread containing the Four of Pentacles refers to a lover of material wealth, one who hoards things of value with no prospect of sharing. In contrast, when the Four of Pentacles is in reverse it warns against the tendency of being a spendthrift.

== Astrological correspondence ==
The Four of Pentacles is associated with Sun in Capricorn.
