= Two of Coins =

Tarot card of the Minor Arcana

Two of Coins (2 di denari) from an Italian deck

The Two of Coins, or Two of Pentacles, is a card used in Latin-suited playing cards which include tarot decks. It is part of what tarot card readers call the "Minor Arcana."

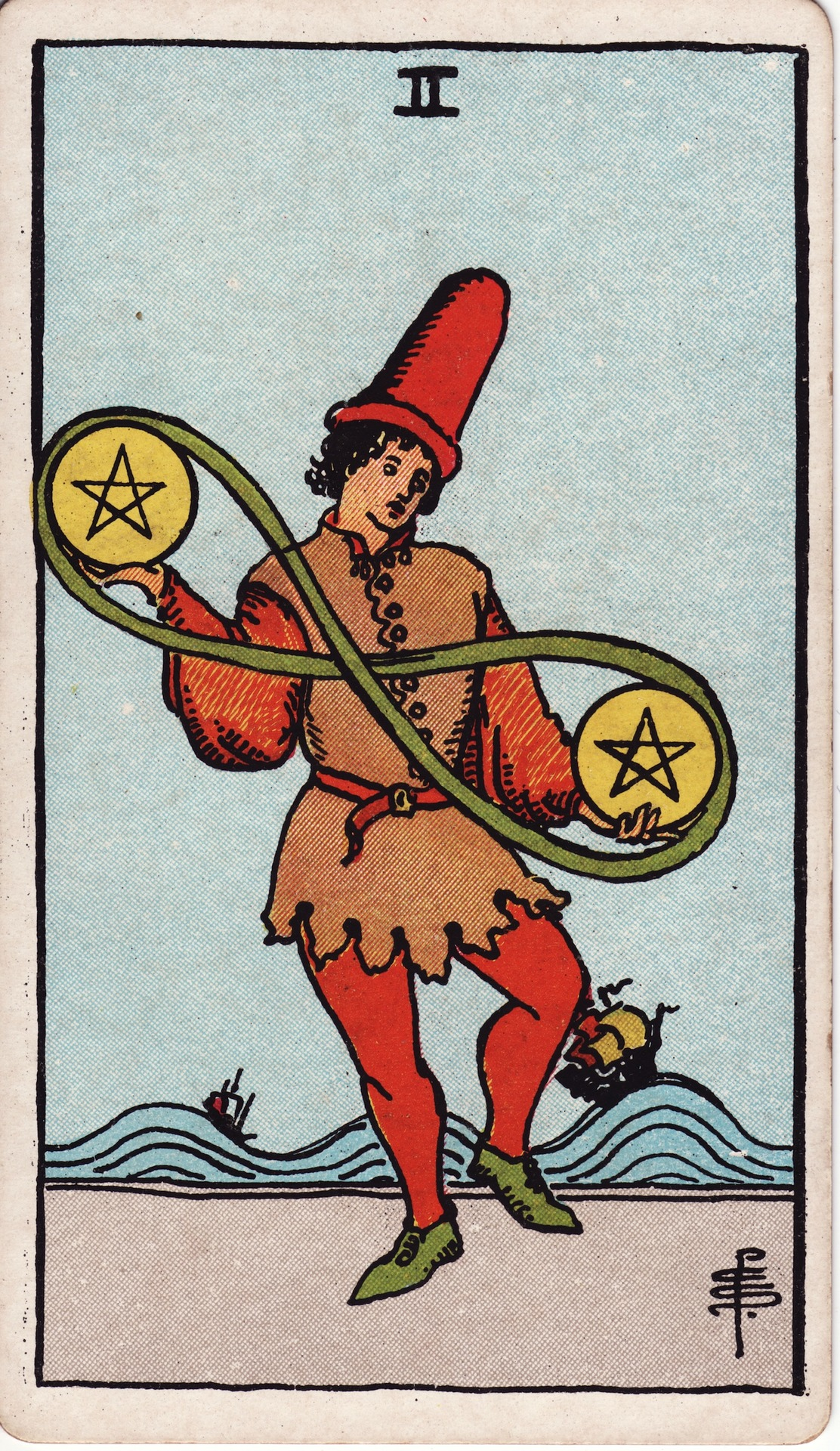
Two of Coins from the Rider–Waite Tarot deck.

Tarot cards are used throughout much of Europe to play tarot card games. In English-speaking countries, where the games are largely unknown, tarot cards came to be utilized primarily for divinatory purposes.

== Symbolism ==
The Rider–Waite two of coins is inspired by the ribbon of traditional tarots which often displayed the name of the card manufacturer.

== Common interpretation ==
The Two of Coins, or the Two of Pentacles, is a card which, when upright, means to juggle, to struggle in a positive influence, to balance, to maintain. To keep your head up but feel like you want to jump out of your skin. It symbolizes an internal mental struggle, being unsure, not knowing your path during ascension.

The reversed card indicates imbalances, excess juggling, excess struggle; the advice of the card is to redress balance.
