= Eight of Coins =

Tarot card of the Minor Arcana

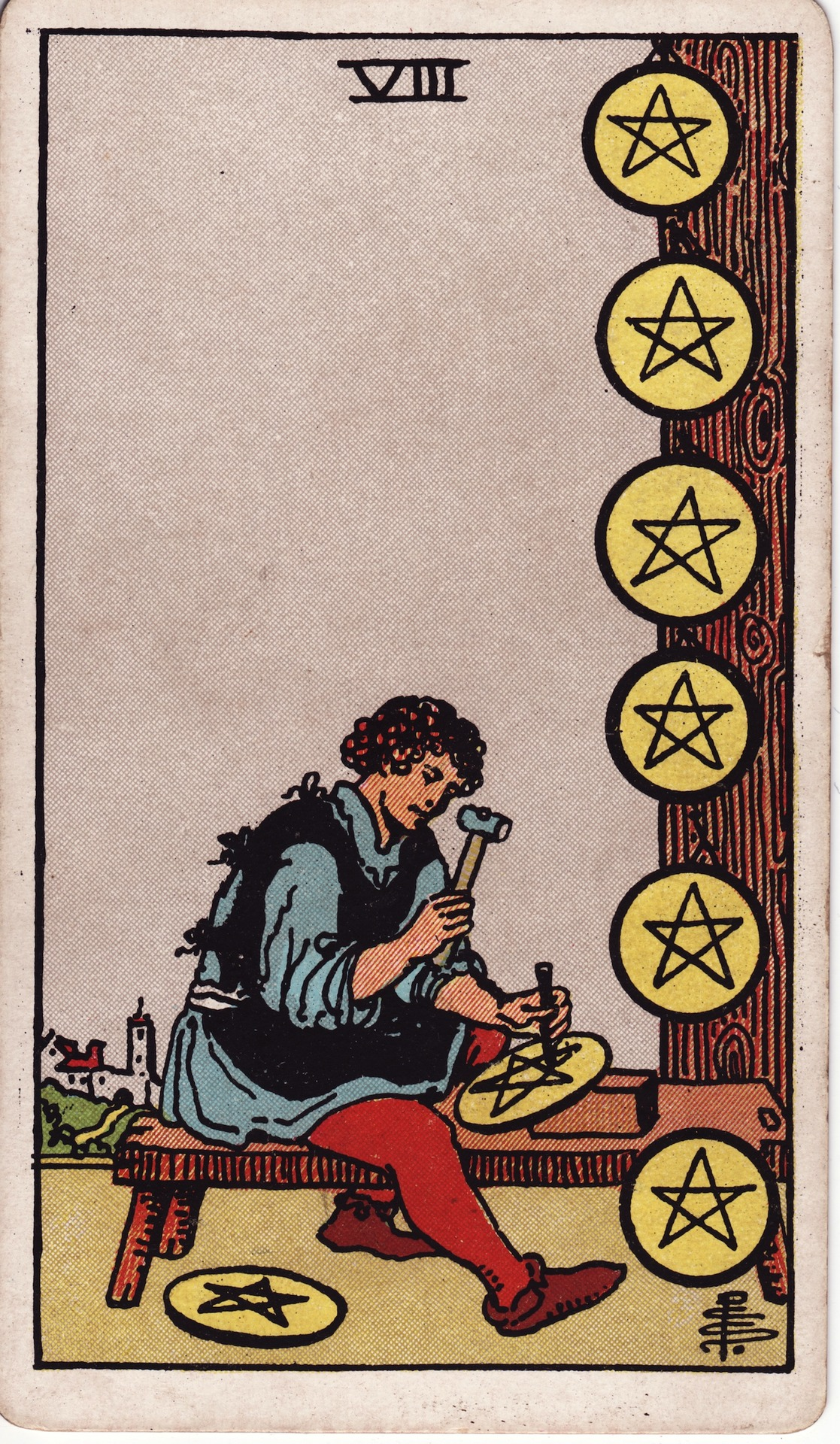
Eight of Coins from the Rider–Waite tarot deck

Eight of Coins is a card used in Latin-suited playing cards which include tarot decks. It is part of what tarot card readers call the "Minor Arcana"

Tarot cards are used throughout much of Europe to play tarot card games. In English-speaking countries, where the games are largely unknown, tarot cards came to be utilized primarily for divinatory purposes.

== Divination usage ==
An artist in stone at his work, which he exhibits in the form of trophies. Divinatory Meanings: Work, employment, commission, craftsmanship, skill in craft and business, perhaps in the preparatory stage. Steady patience with achievement kept in mind. Reversed: Voided ambition, vanity, cupidity, exaction, usury. It may also signify the possession of skill, in the sense of the ingenious mind turned to cunning and intrigue.
