= Suit of wands =

Tarot card suit

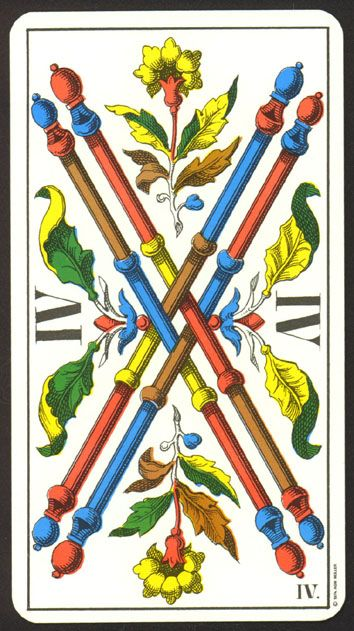
- Four of Wands from the 1JJ Tarot deck
- Deck: Minor Arcana

The suit of wands is one of four suits of the Minor Arcana in a tarot deck. Like the other tarot suits, the suit of wands contains fourteen cards: ace (one), two through ten, page and knight (sometimes referred to as princess and prince), queen and king. When Tarot cards are used to play Tarot card games, wands correspond to the suit of batons. Tarot cards came to be utilized for divinatory purposes by esotericists such as Eliphas Levi and were regularized into the divinatory form most known today by the Hermetic Order of the Golden Dawn and the Rider–Waite Tarot, created by a Golden Dawn member.

== Divinatory and occult meanings ==
In Aleister Crowley's 1944 The Book of Thoth, the suit of wands is associated with the action of the Will and the element of fire. The meaning of the suit as a whole focuses on ideas or readings associated with primal energy, spirituality, inspiration, determination, strength, intuition, creativity, ambition, expansion, and original thought.

Generally the suit is interpreted by modern English-language astrology practitioners as relating to work and accomplishments, or even anything broadly related to fruitfulness. Reaping the benefits of hard work is a fundamental aspect of such interpretations of the suit.

Similar themes include new beginnings, final endings, and creative destruction (such as the way controlled usage of fire can be used to clear land in preparation for new crops, or planting). This metaphorical relationship between the suit and fire is often explored by tarot practitioners who are also basing interpretations on astrology.

The cards of this suit also evoke the wide-eyed optimism of youth and the basic driving force of life.

The meanings of the Wands Tarot cards deal with the spiritual level of consciousness and mirror what is important to you at the core of your being. They address what makes you tick – your personality, ego, enthusiasm, self-concept, and personal energy, both internal and external.

The negative aspects of the Suit of Wands include illusion, egotistical behaviour, impulsiveness, a lack of direction or purpose, or a perception of meaninglessness.

Wands cards often represent the astrological signs of Fire: Leo, Sagittarius and Aries. A wands court card often relates to a person with a Leo, Sagittarius or Aries star sign. Generally, Wands people are energetic, charismatic, warm and spiritual.

=== Card images in the Rider–Waite tarot deck ===
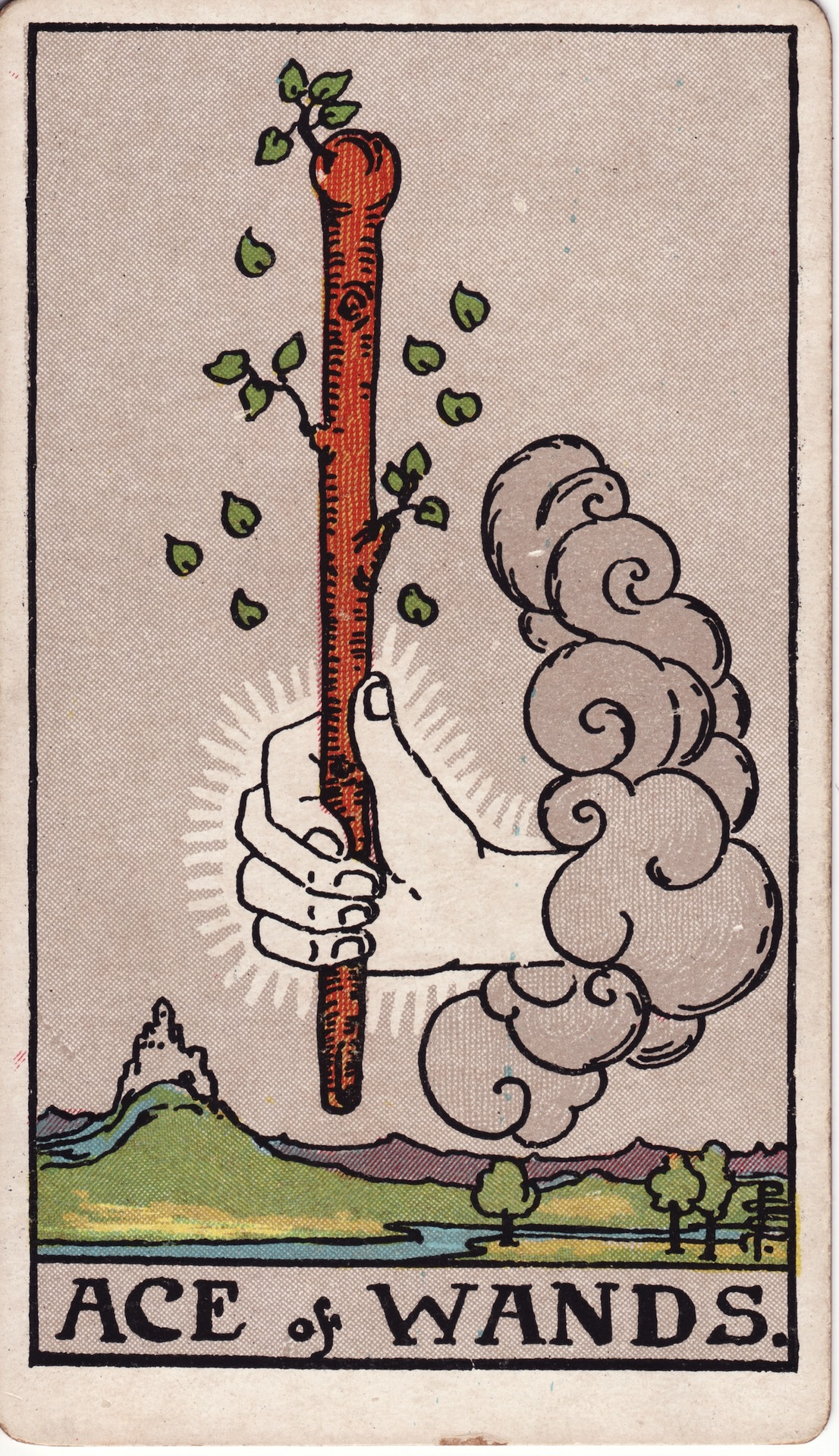
Ace of Wands

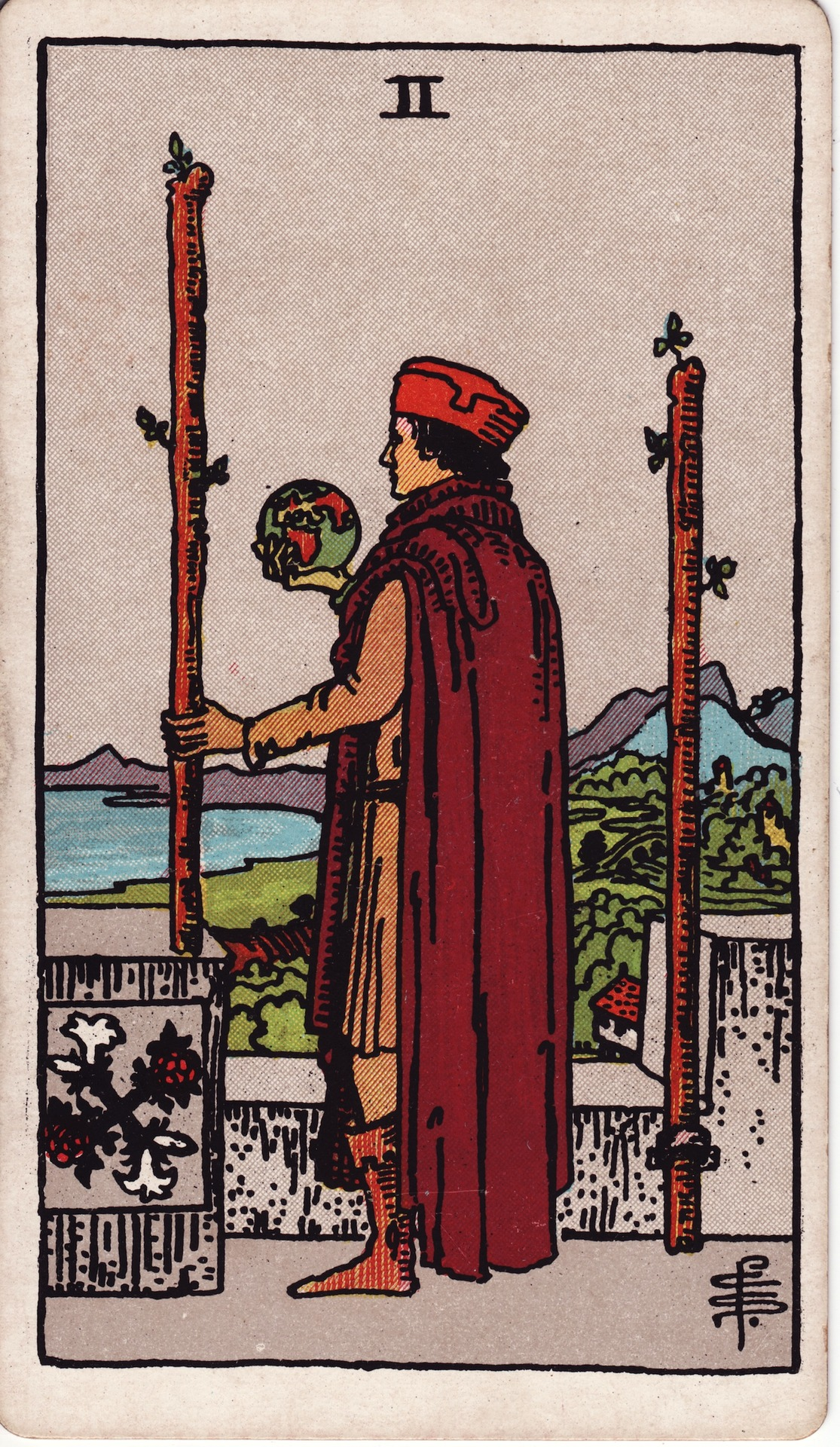
Two of Wands

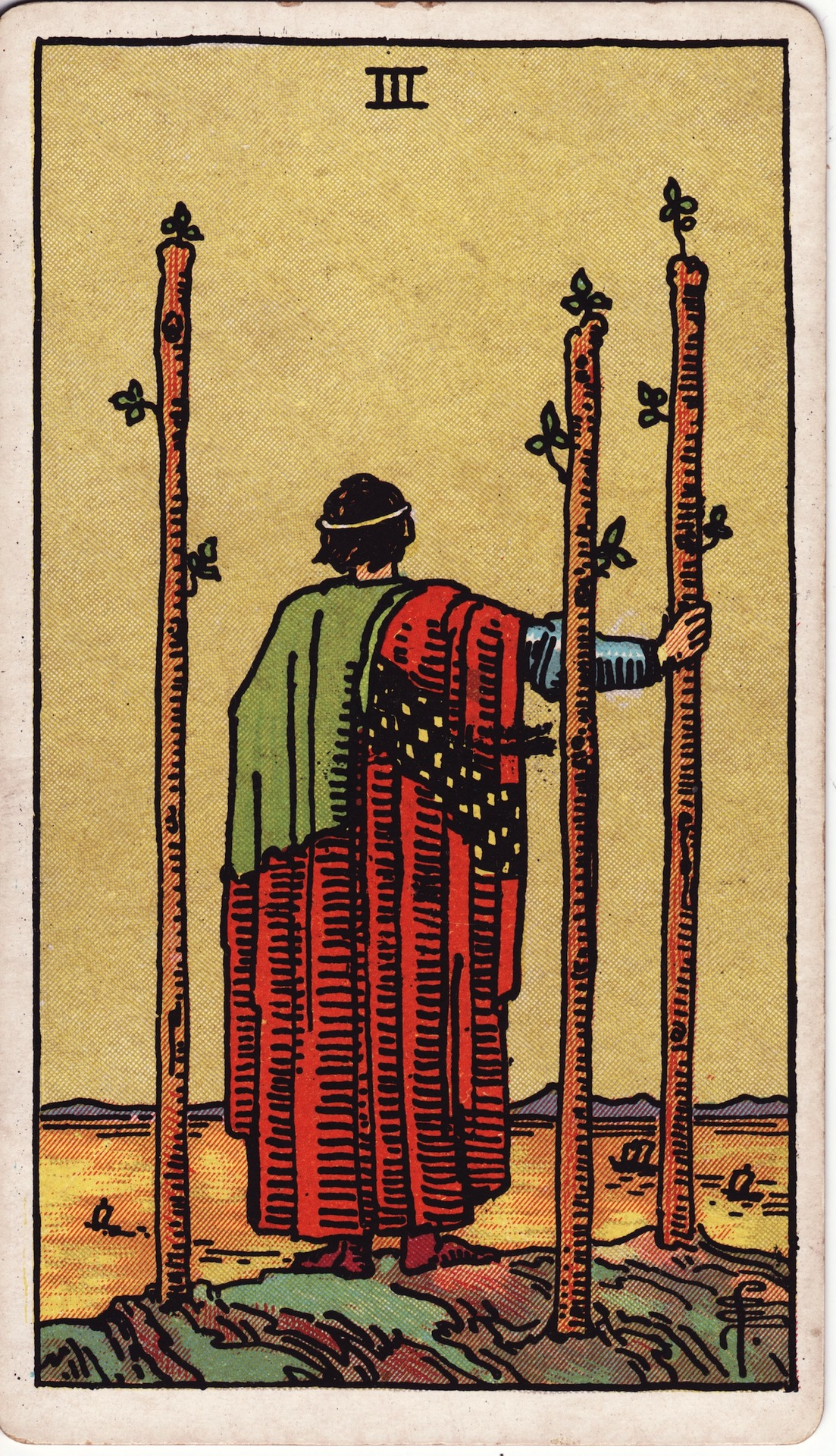
Three of Wands

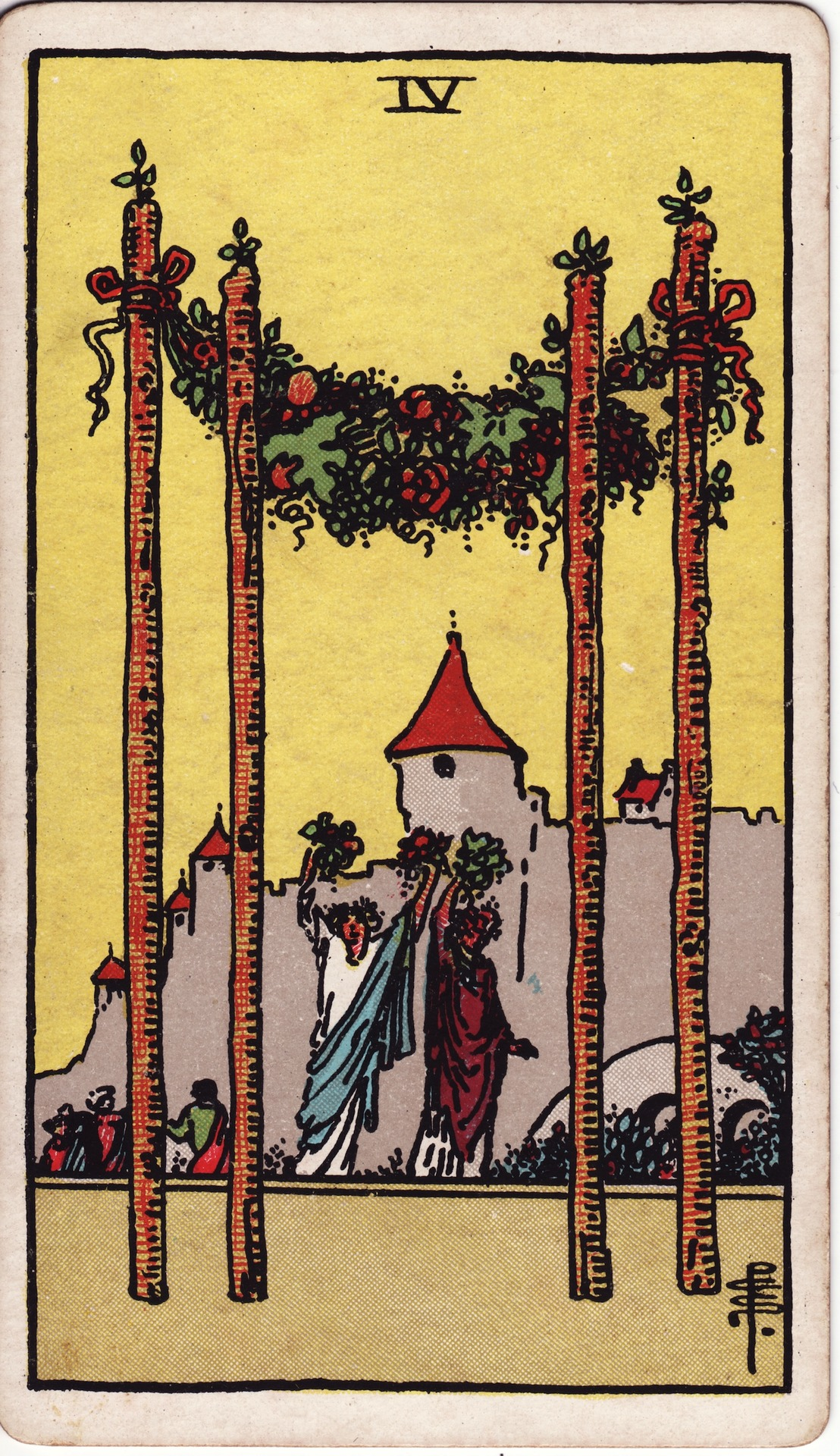
Four of Wands

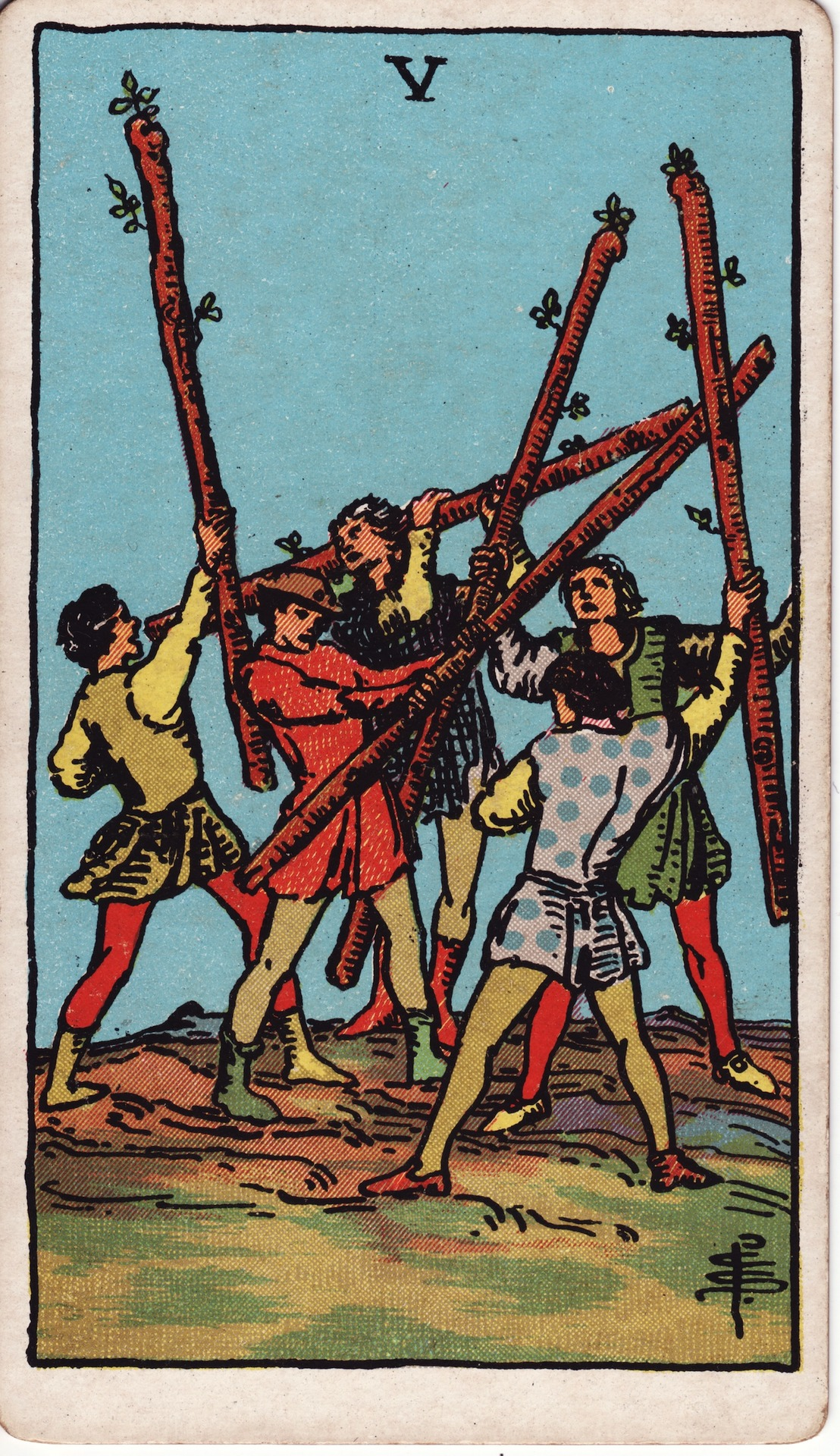
Five of Wands

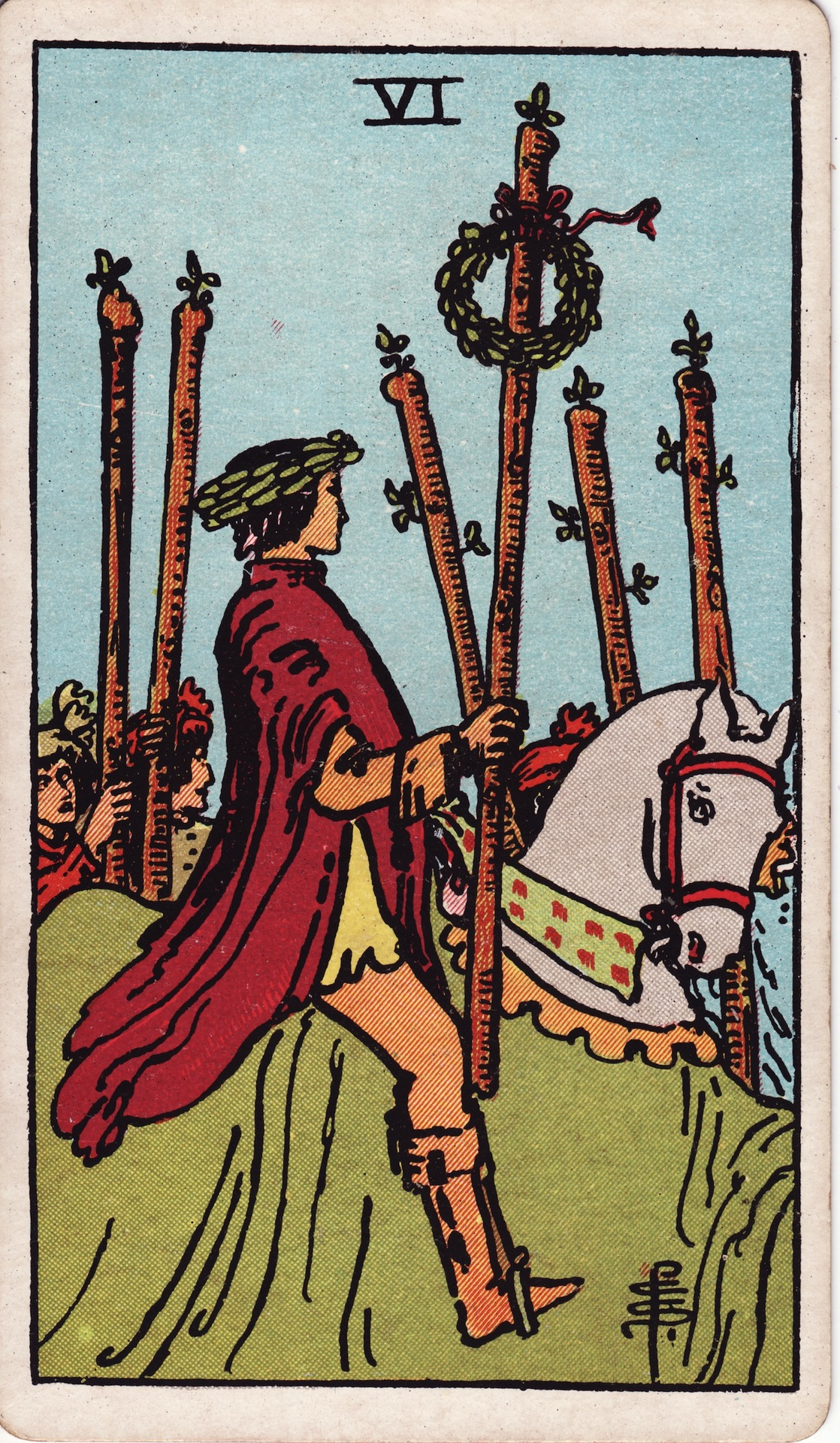
Six of Wands

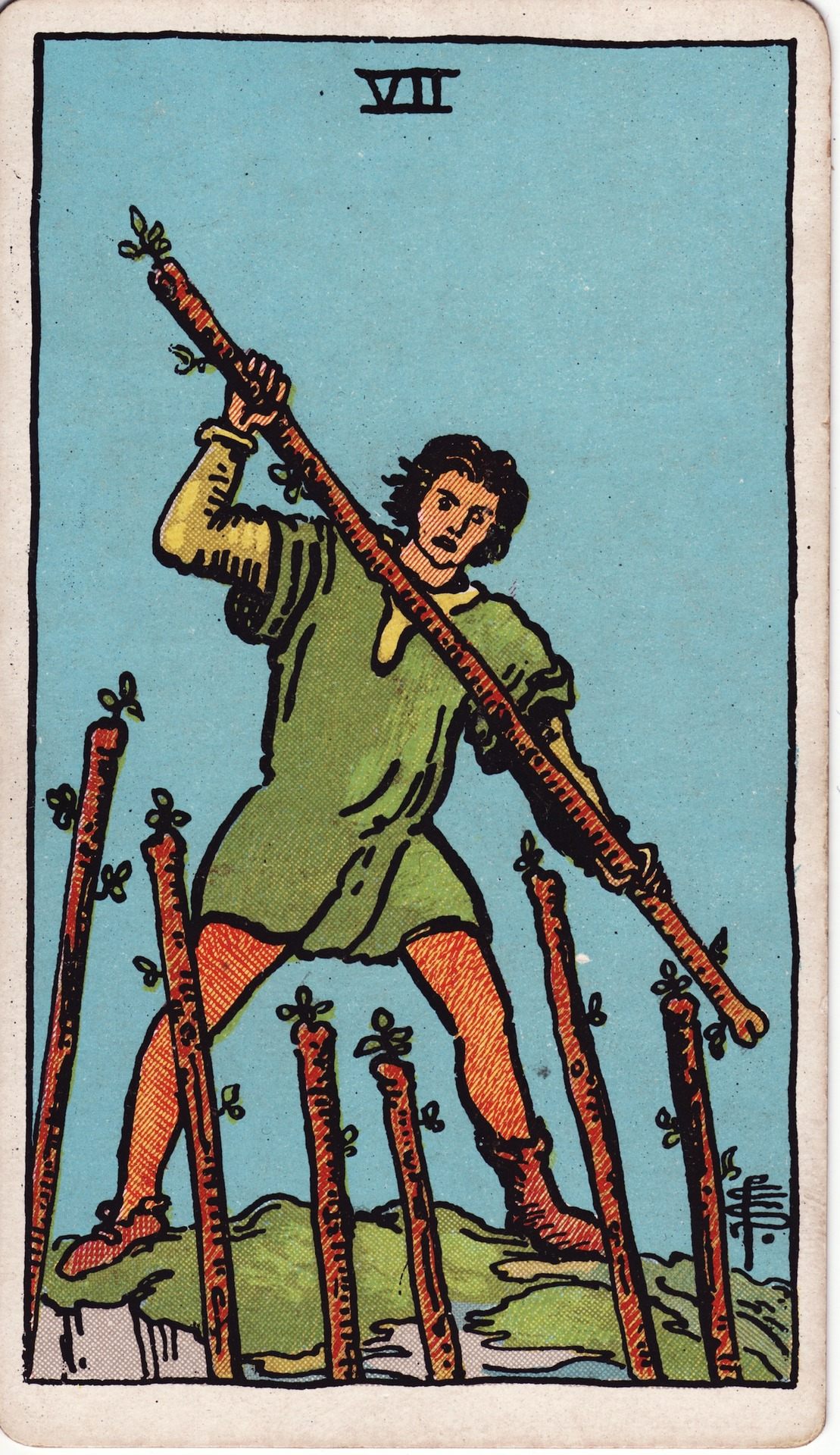
Seven of Wands

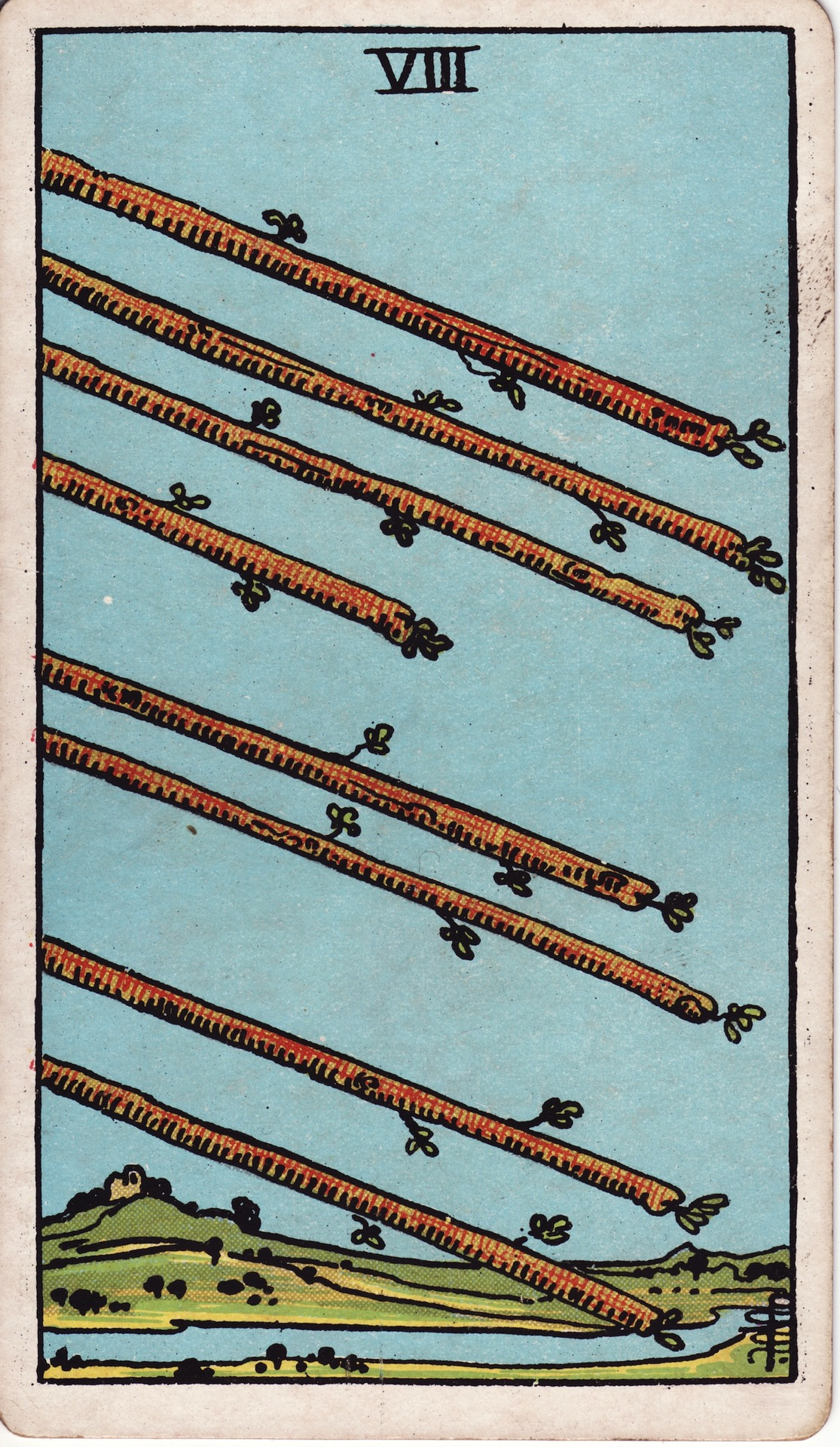
Eight of Wands

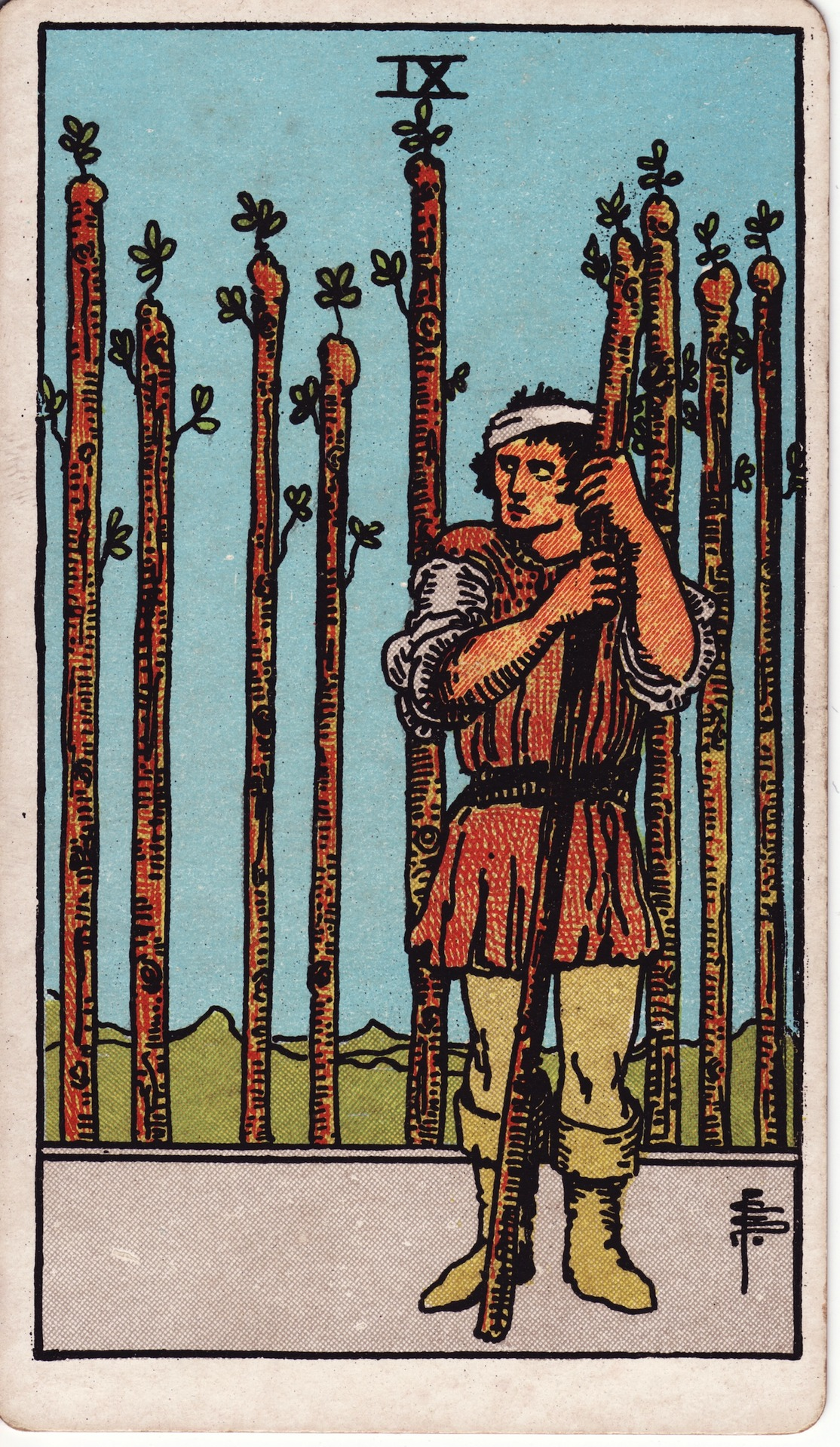
Nine of Wands

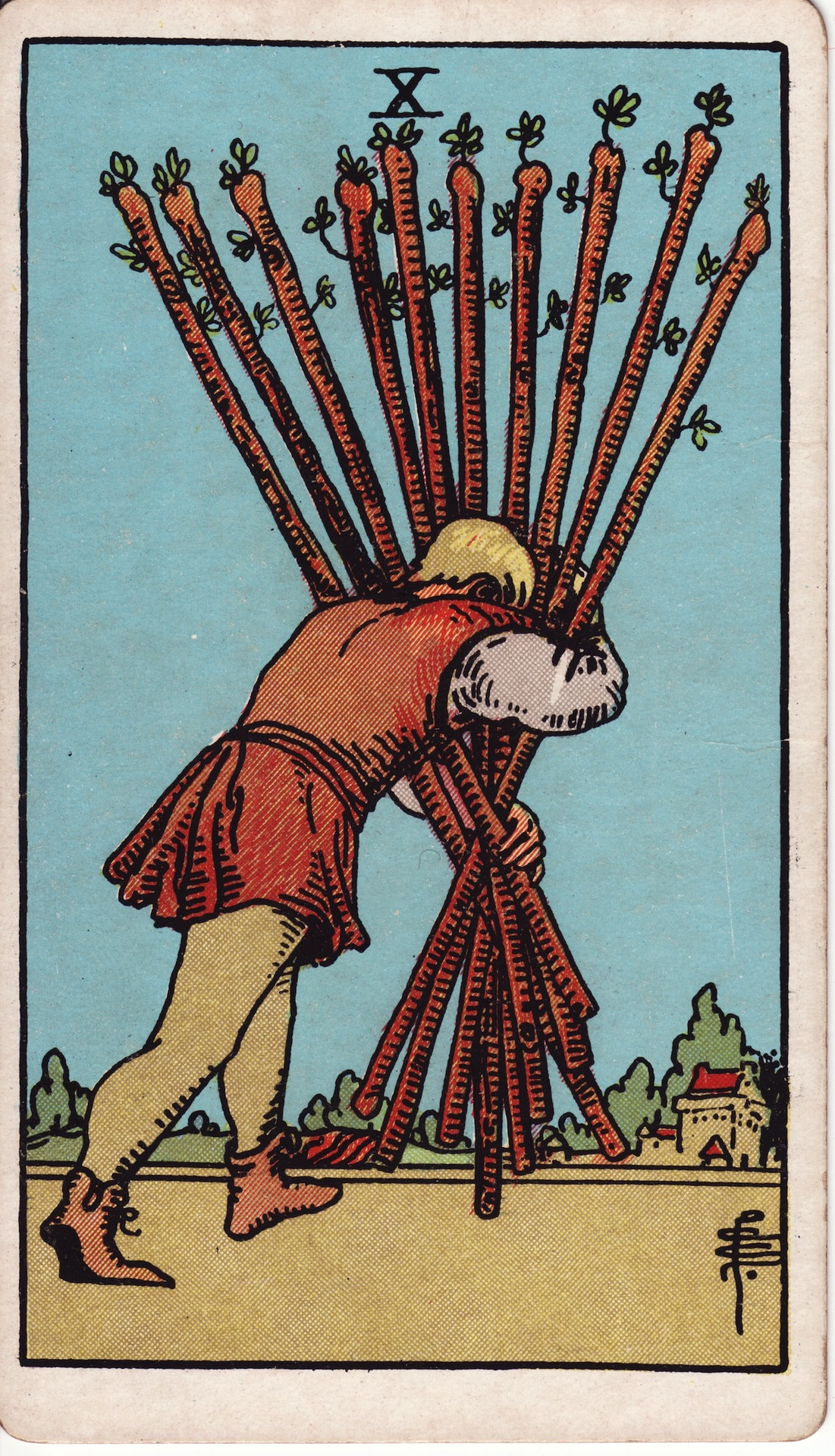
Ten of Wands

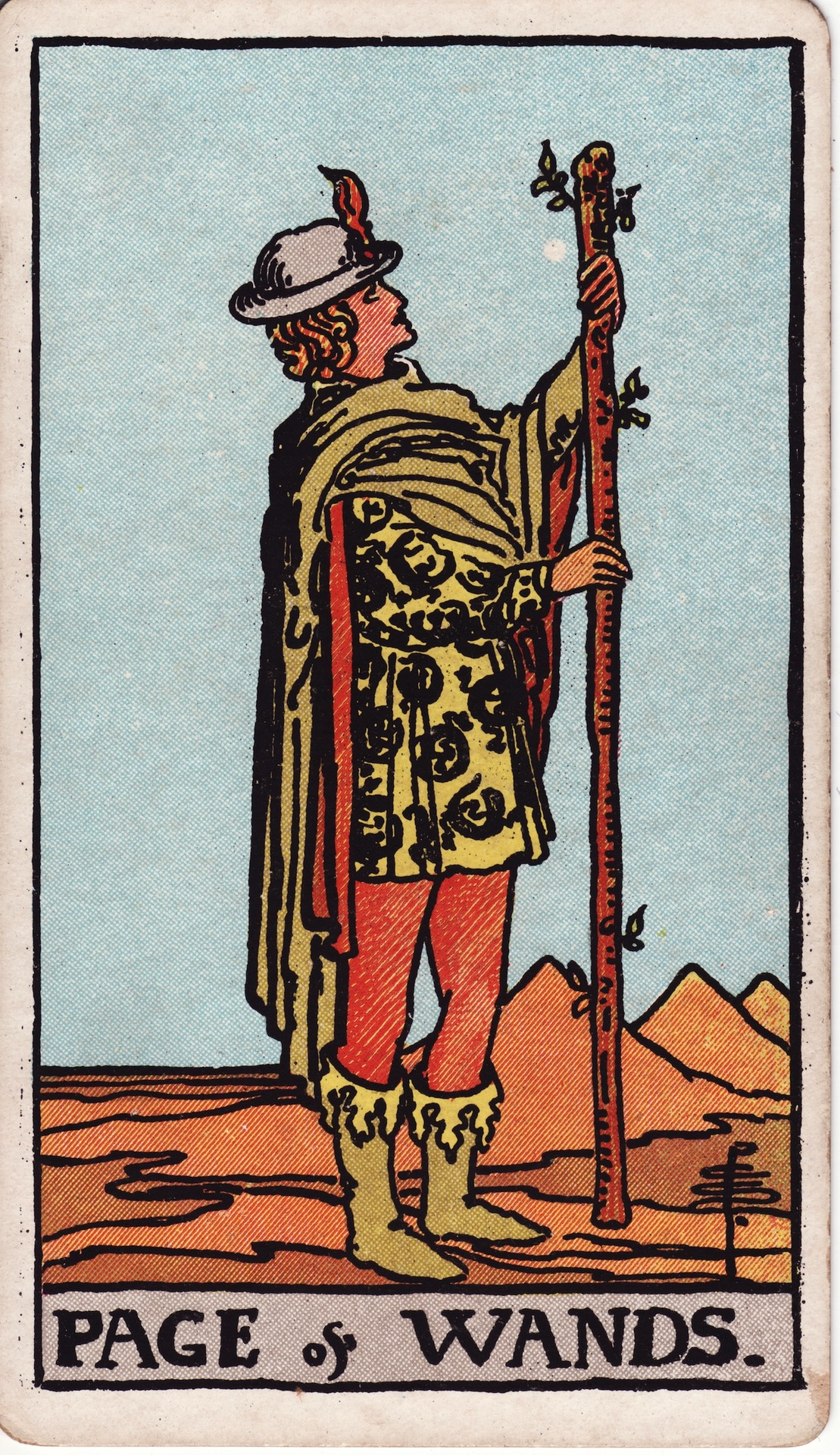
Page of Wands

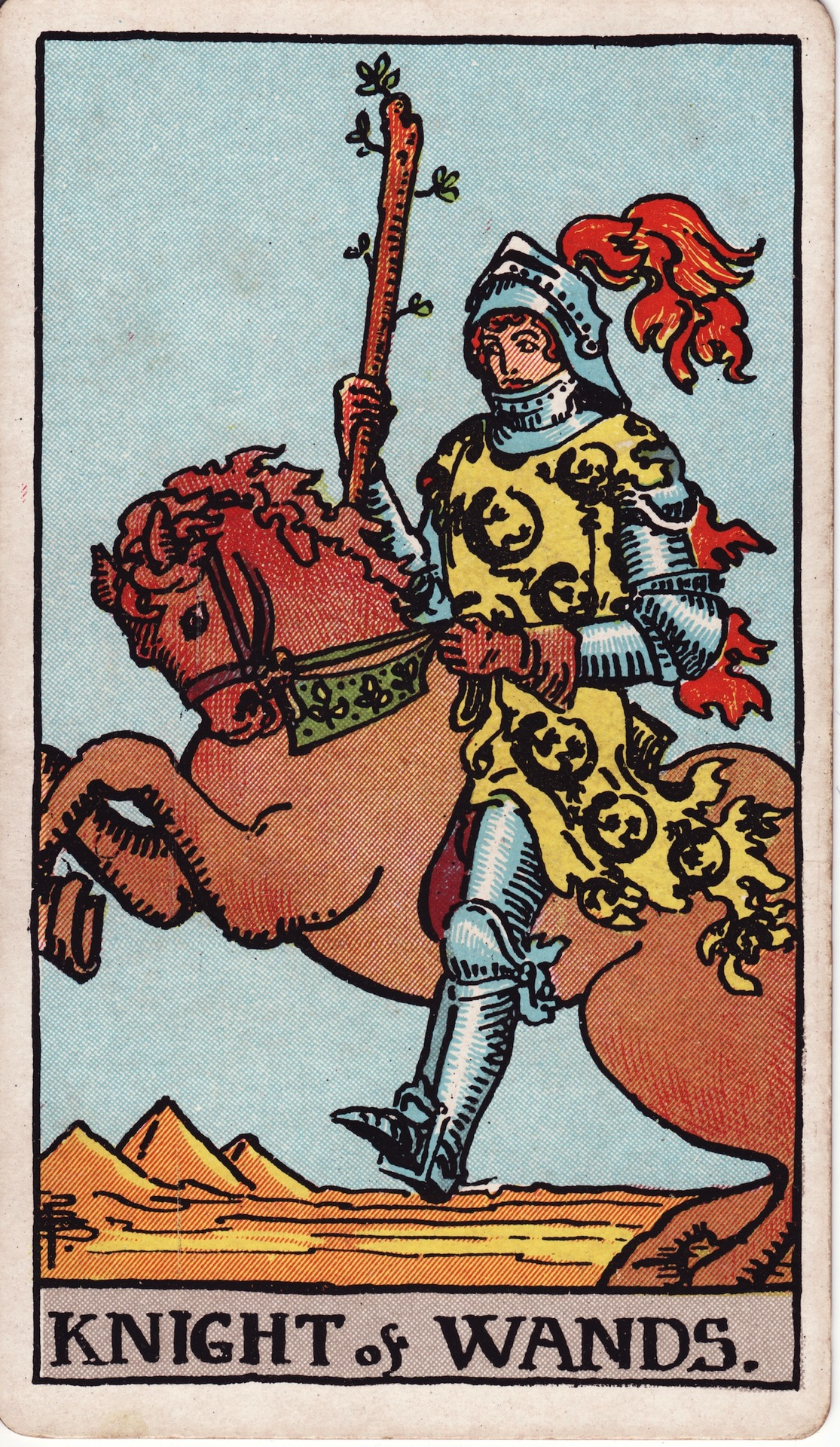
Knight of Wands

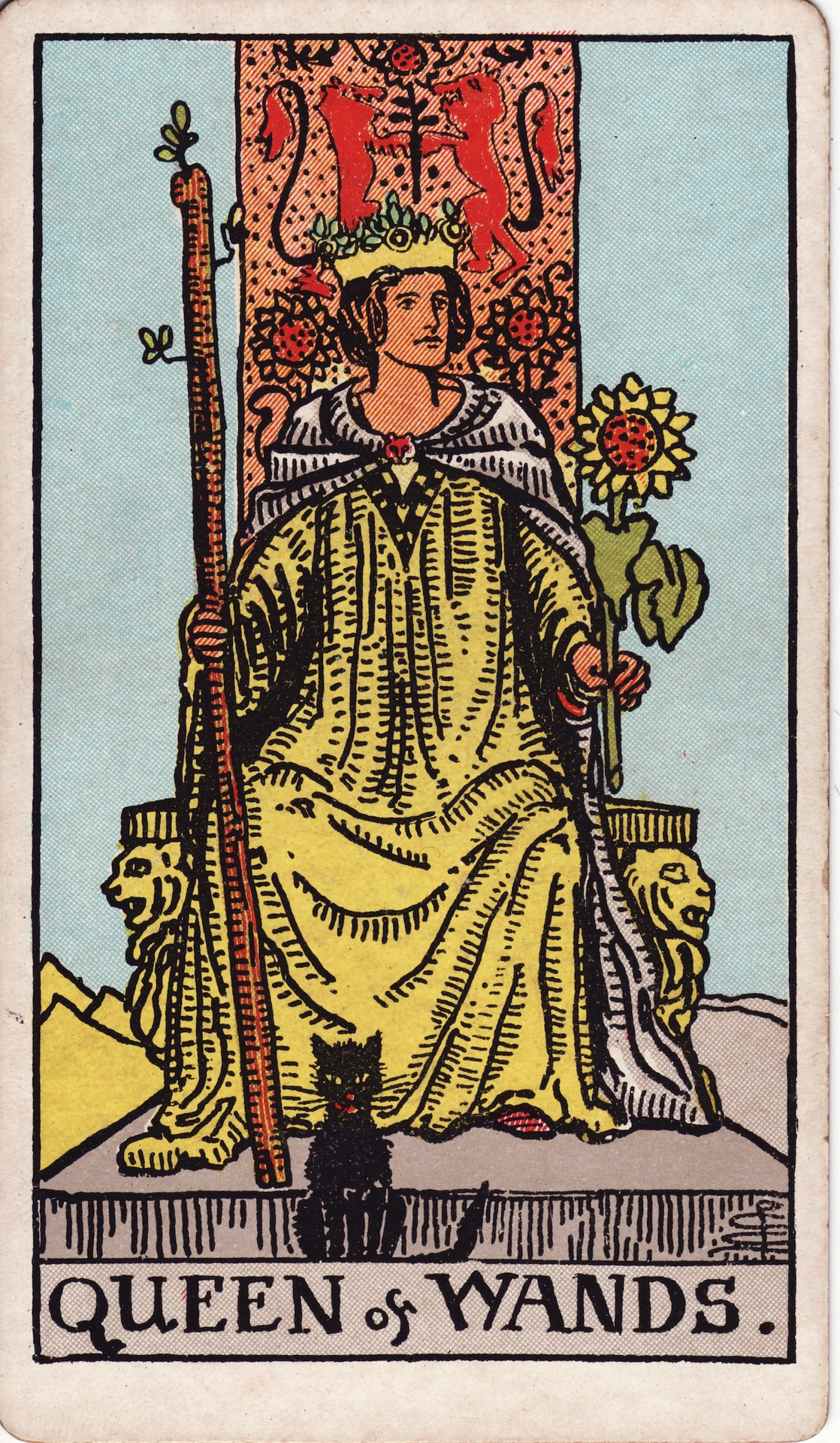
Queen of Wands

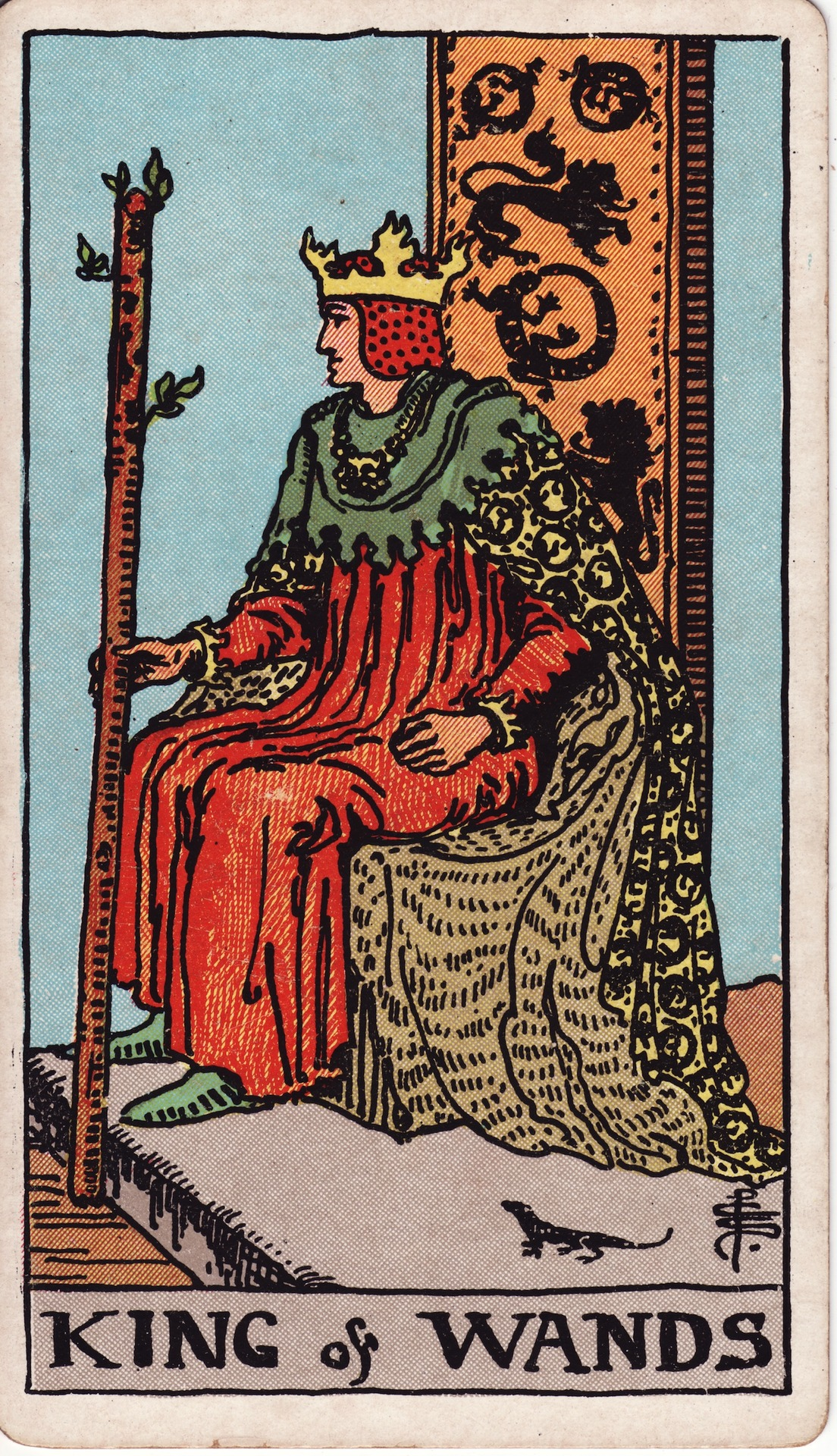
King of Wands

== See also ==
- Batons – suit of Latin (Italian/Spanish) playing cards
