= Ace of Wands =

Ace of Wands may refer to:

- Ace of Wands (Tarot card), a Tarot card of the Minor Arcana
- Ace of Wands (TV series), British children's television show
