= Three of Wands =

Tarot card of the Minor Arcana

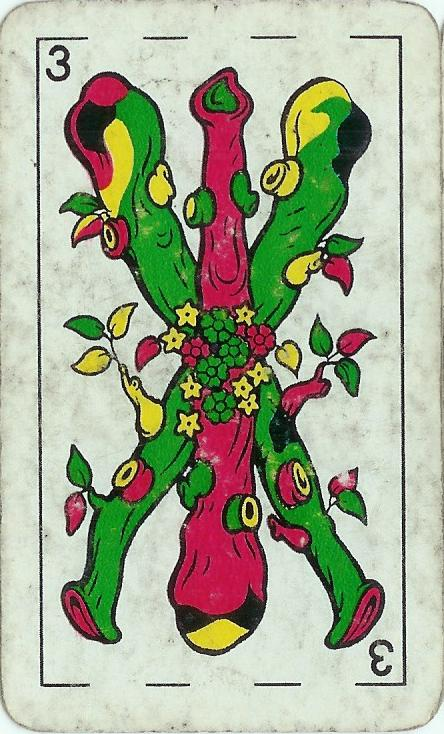
Three of Batons ("bastos") from a Spanish deck

The Three of Wands, or Three of Batons, is a playing card of the suit of wands. In tarot, it is a Minor Arcana card.

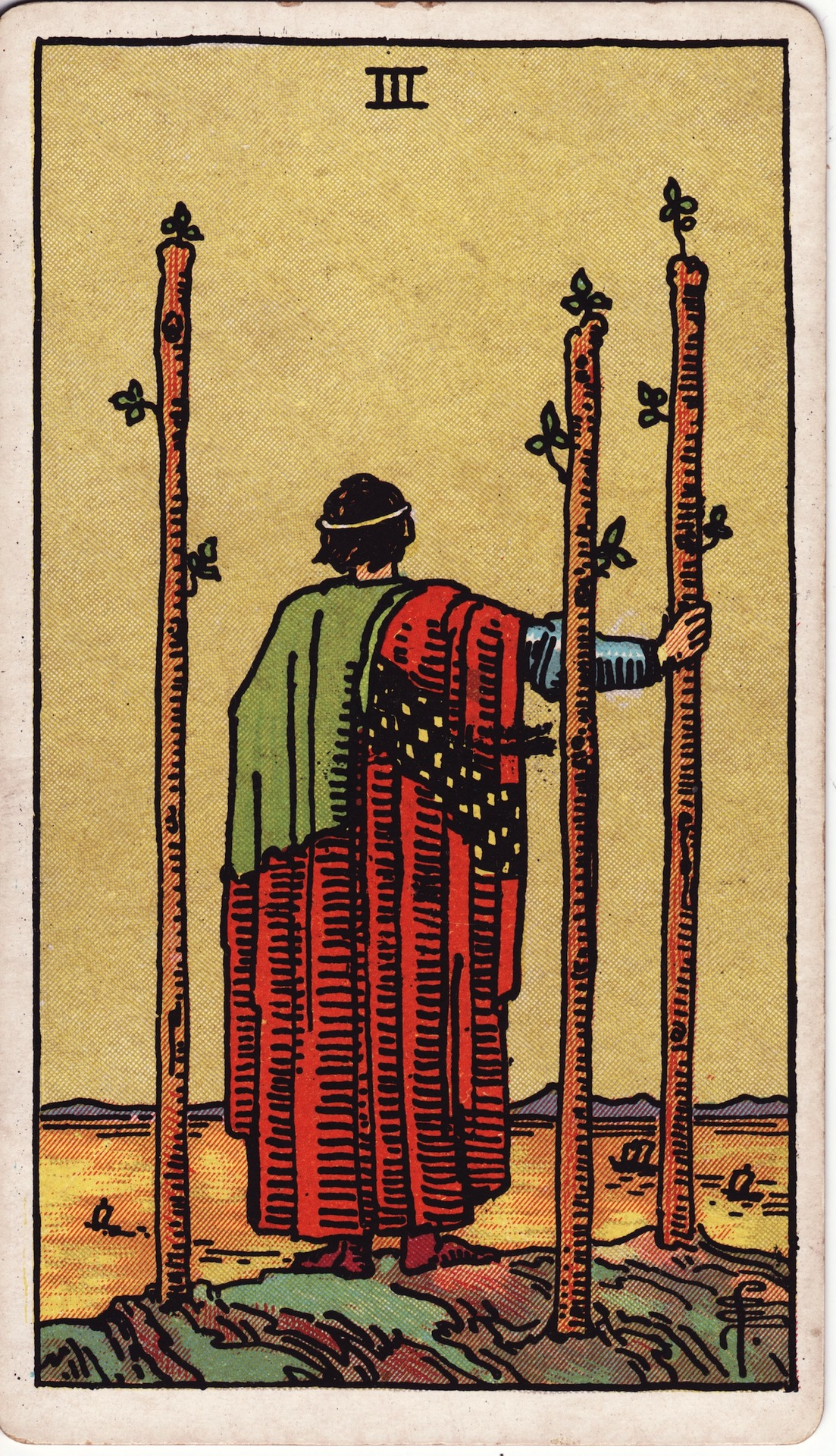
Three of Wands from the Rider–Waite tarot deck

Tarot cards are used throughout much of Europe to play tarot card games. In English-speaking countries, where the games are largely unknown, tarot cards came to be utilized primarily for divinatory purposes.

== Divination usage ==
A calm onlooker facing towards the sea. There's a possibility that he is a merchant or looking forward to a journey. The three represents creation—looking forward to something with optimism—a mission. This card symbolizes enterprise, trade, or commerce.

Keynotes: achievement – venture – traveling – pursuing a journey

If the card is reversed, it means the end of a task, toil, a cessation, and disappointment.

== Key meanings ==
The key meanings of the Three of Wands:

- Achievement
- Fresh starts
- Long-term success
- Partnerships
- Trade

== In popular culture ==
In the 1922 poem The Waste Land, T. S. Eliot associates The Man with Three Staves with the Fisher King, "quite arbitrarily".
