= Ten of Wands =

Tarot card of the Minor Arcana

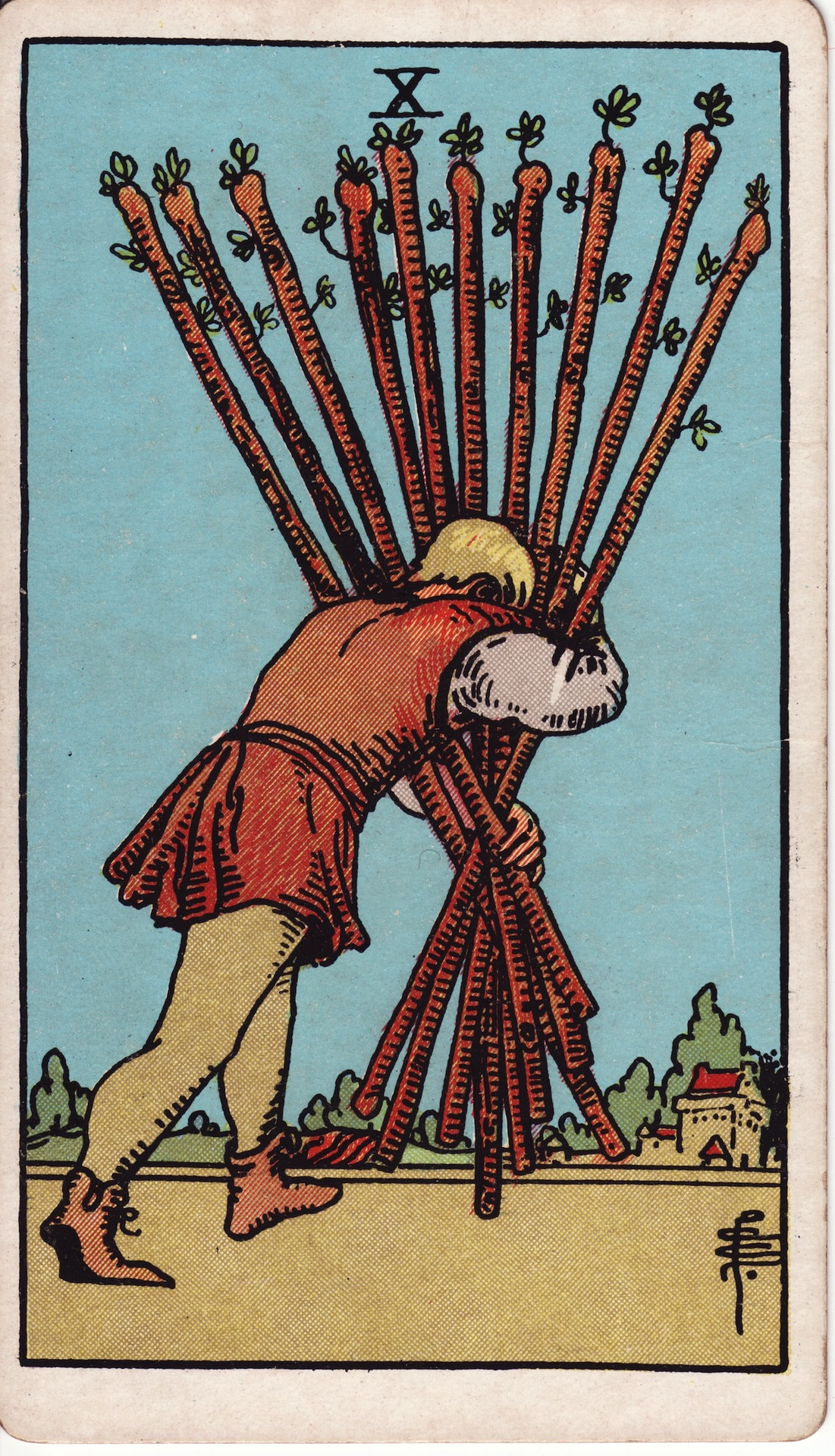
Ten of Wands from the Rider–Waite tarot deck

The Ten of Wands is a Minor Arcana Tarot card of the suit of wands.

Tarot cards are used throughout much of Europe to play tarot card games. In English-speaking countries, where the games are largely unknown, tarot cards came to be utilized primarily for divinatory purposes.

== Divination usage ==
Most often, the Ten of Wands card carries the meaning of overload and burdening situations where too much responsibility has been taken on by the subject.

== Rider–Waite symbolism ==
- A person overburdened by his enterprise, is nevertheless active and on the move, but not seeing past his wands (or obligations).
- A city can be observed in the background. He may be headed there, perhaps with the goal of ridding himself of this load.
