= Queen of Wands =

Tarot card of the Minor Arcana

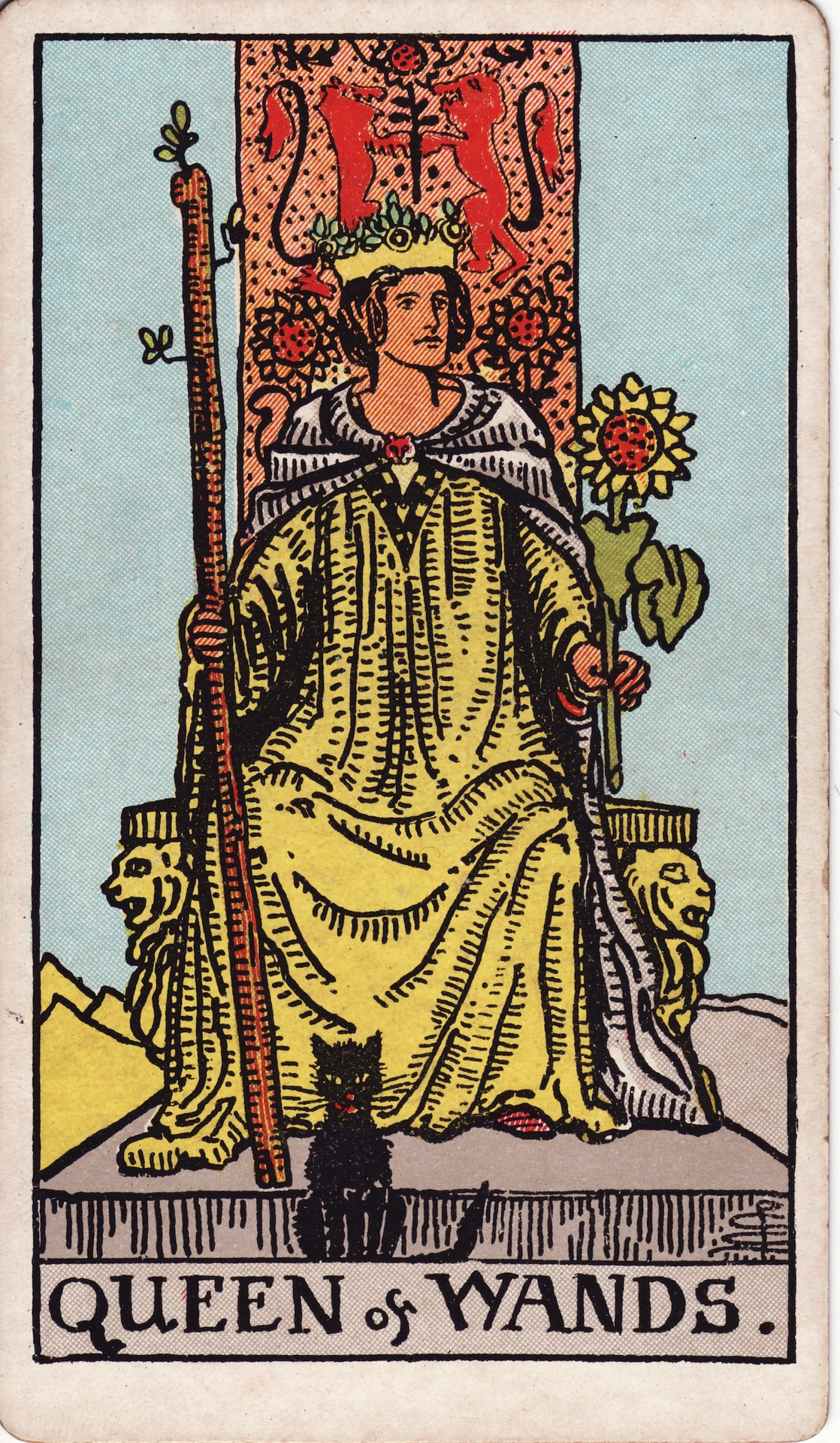
Queen of Wands from the Rider–Waite tarot deck

The Queen of Wands is a court card in the Minor Arcana set of the tarot.

Tarot cards are used throughout much of Europe to play tarot card games. In English-speaking countries, where the games are largely unknown, tarot cards came to be utilized primarily for divinatory purposes.

== Divination usage ==
Its keywords include: attractive, wholehearted, energetic, cheerful, and self-assured.

=== Symbolic components and composition ===
The Queen of Wands combines the properties of the suit of wands, associated with elemental fire, with the figure of the Queen, which embodies nurturing, feminine, inwardly-focused and embracing personality. This combination results in a card which represents a vivacious and warm personality, full of a fiery passion put to the service of encouragement, assurement, attraction, esteem, and enthusiasm. The back of her throne doesn't have a top, indicating endless possibilities. The lions on the back of her throne are associated with the element fire. Her golden attire shows that she is strong and her fire is burning with great intensity. The desert behind her is another indicator of fire. The rocks on the right side of her throne can show toughness, a hard soul, her independence.

The sign of Leo is strongly associated with this card due to the lions adorning her throne, as well as the lion pendant clasping her cape. She is holding a sunflower, which may represent a fertile and joyous life, but may also further suggest a connection to Leo. In their bud stage, sunflowers face and track the sun in its motion across the sky, a behavior called heliotropism. The sun in astrology is considered to be the ruling planet of the sign of Leo. The black cat at her feet shows that luck favors her, as black cats are viewed as bringers of good or bad luck. The nature of cats may also show that she has tamed her darker impulses yet understands and follows her own instincts, thus representing her self-aware and independent nature. Black cats are also commonly associated with occultism and the dark arts, suggesting intuitive understanding of the world.

=== Interpretation ===
The Queen of Wands is said by some to represent one's basic instinct. Her strength and task are providing initial inputs. She says to you that you must think of the consequences of what you do, but that you must be sure to focus on what will get you moving and how to do it.

Directness, spontaneity and independence are very special talents that others admire, as long as you accept that others may be your polar opposite. Don't get tricked into becoming impatient. If the sun "shines" in your heart, you can overcome your fears and walk your own path. "Approach your tasks as steps and take every one of them with assurance." (quote of Evelin Burger and Johannes Fiebag)

One possible interpretation is that the card represents a sincere, friendly, chaste, or loving woman who might become influential or is currently present in the querent's life. The Queen of Wands can indicate a woman who is very helpful and kind. She may be the querent or she may stand for a woman in the querent's life who is older than the querent, has hair on the lighter end of the spectrum, and who is considered to be a very supportive, giving person. She could represent a mother like figure.

==== Reversed interpretation ====
The card reversed could represent qualities such as good, economical, obliging, serviceable and hospitality. It can also signify opposition, jealousy, and even deceit and infidelity.

== Key meanings ==
The key meanings of the Queen of Wands:

- Career-oriented
- Hard worker
- Honest
- Independent and home-loving
- Thoughtful
