= Eight of Wands =

Tarot card of the Minor Arcana

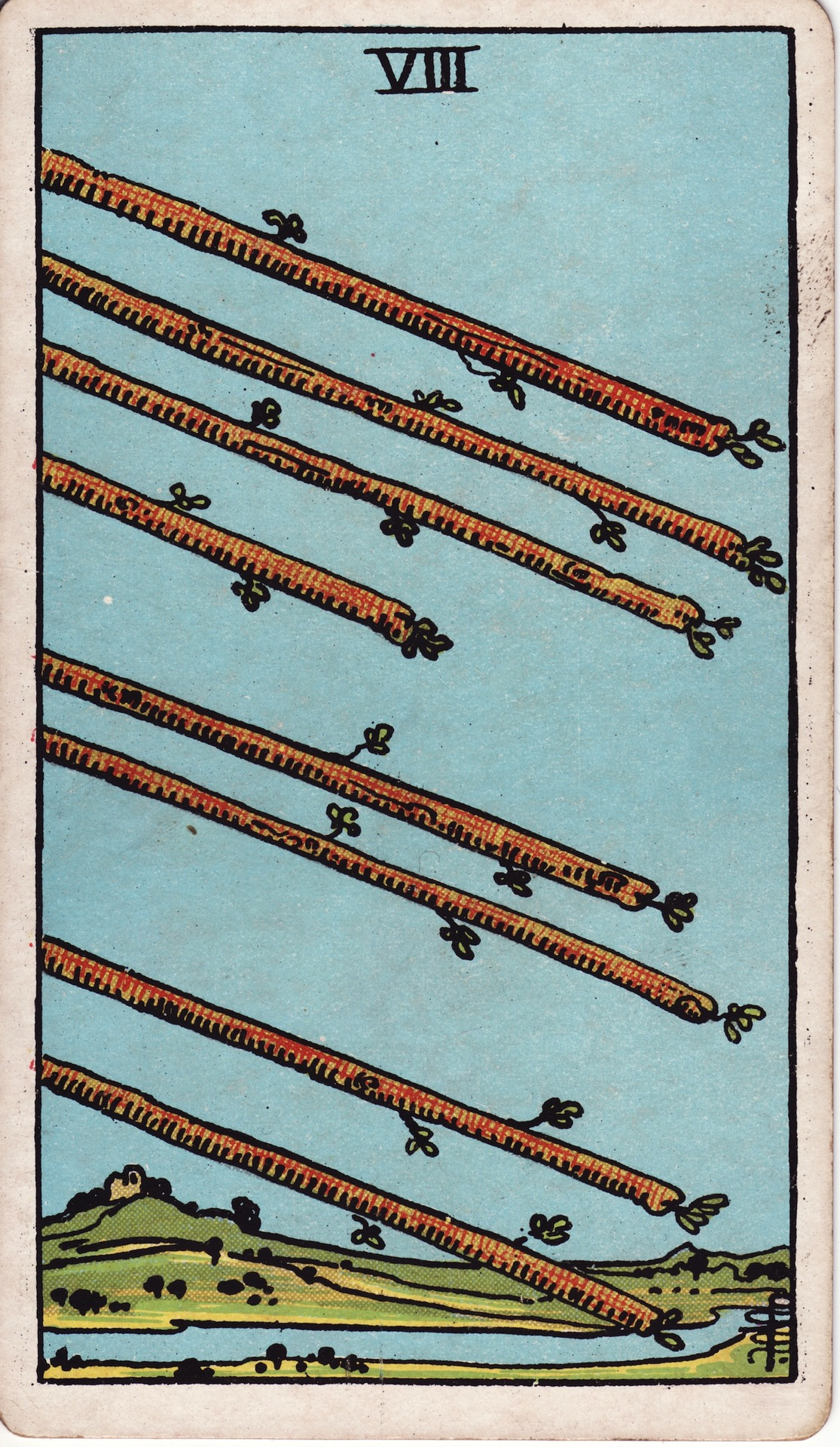
Eight of Wands from the Rider–Waite tarot deck

The Eight of Wands is a Minor Arcana tarot card. In the Rider–Waite deck, the card shows eight diagonal staves of staggered length angled across an open landscape with river, as designed by artist Pamela Colman Smith.

Tarot cards are used throughout much of Europe to play tarot card games. In English-speaking countries, where the games are largely unknown, tarot cards came to be utilized primarily for divinatory purposes.

== Divinatory purposes ==
A card of action; swiftness. Conveys immediate information or action. News swiftly travelling. Because the suit of wands relates to information, look for new communication and unexpected news. Depending on surrounding cards in the draw, may indicate the speed of these events.

== Key meanings ==
The key meanings of the Eight of Wands:

- Hasty actions
- Journey and travel
- A journey or flight
- Motion
- End to a delay
