= Six of Wands =

Tarot card of the Minor Arcana

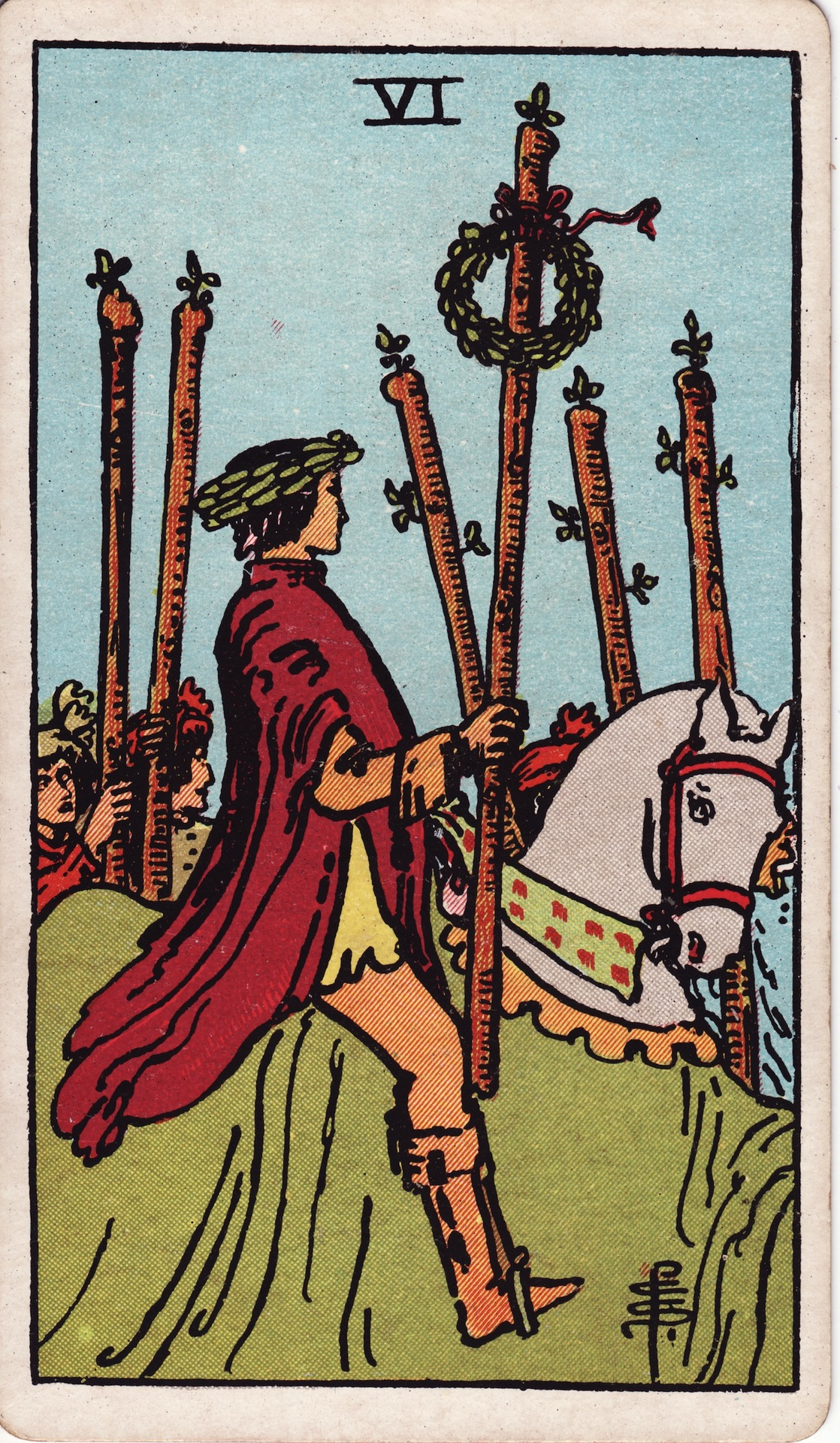
Six of Wands from the Rider–Waite tarot deck

The Six of Wands, or Six of Batons, is a card used in Latin-suited playing cards, which include tarot decks. It is part of what tarot card readers call the "Minor Arcana," the six of wands cards in divination decks with illustrated pip cards, displays a laureled horseman bearing a staff adorned with laurel crown. Footmen with staves are at his side.

Tarot cards are used throughout much of Europe to play tarot card games. In English-speaking countries, where the games are largely unknown, tarot cards came to be utilized primarily for divinatory purposes.

== Rider–Waite symbolism ==
- After the messiness of the previous card, organization has been reached under leadership of the figure on the horse.
- The mounted horseman seeming to galvanize the mass, may represent mobilization, either social or more symbolically of the forces within.
- The laurel wreath he wears marks him as a man of success and triumph, competent, honored and confident.

== Key meanings ==
The key meanings of the Six of Wands:

- Completion
- Good news
- Reward and recognition
- Success
- Triumph
