= Ace of Wands (tarot card) =

Tarot card of the Minor Arcana

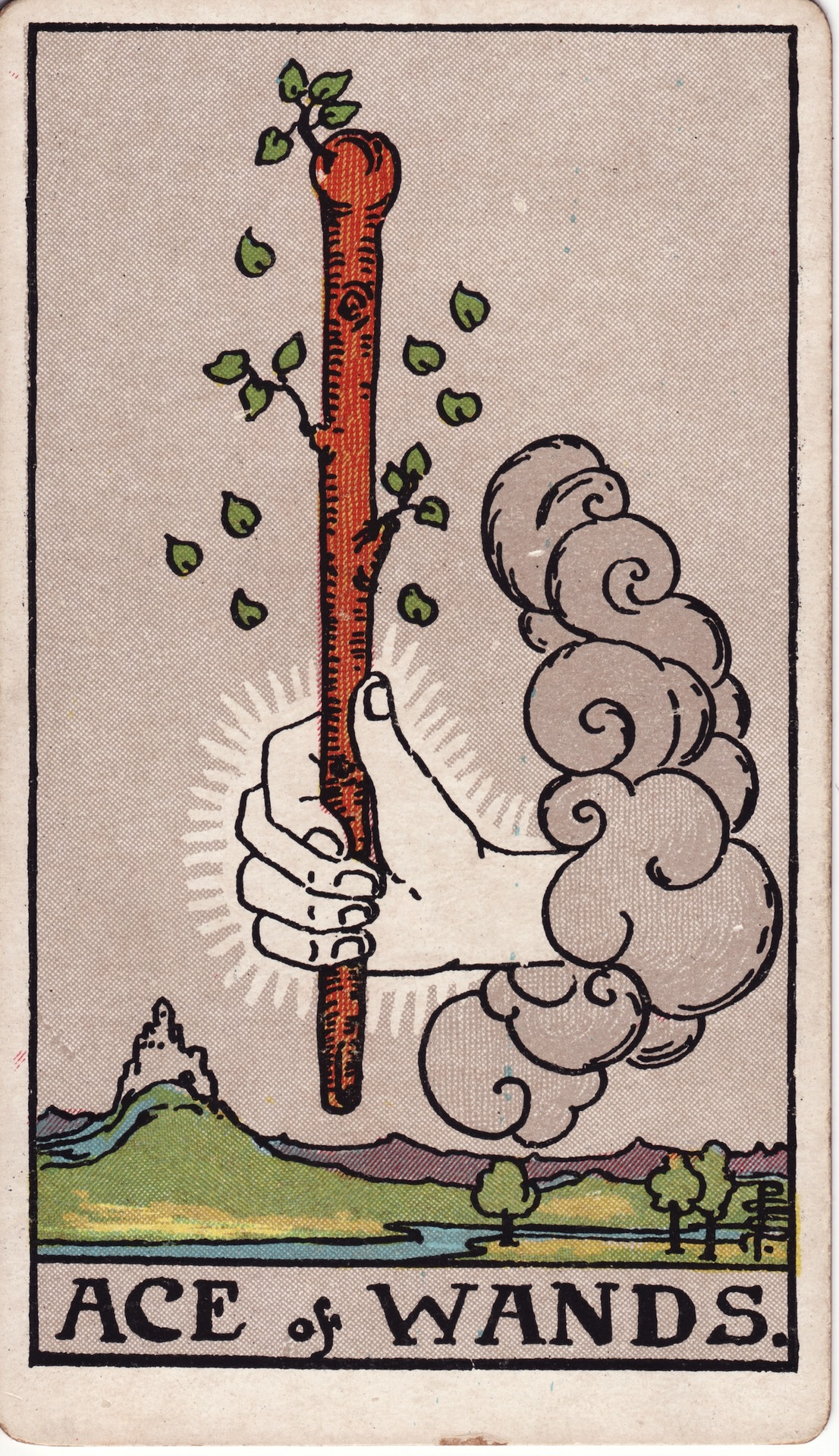
Ace of Wands from the Rider–Waite tarot deck

The Ace of Wands is a tarot card of the Minor Arcana, arcana being Latin for mysteries. The cards of the Minor Arcana are considered to be lesser compared to the Major Arcana because they discuss the minor mysteries of life, less important archetypes. Modern tarot readers interpret the Ace of Wands as a symbol of optimism and invention.

== Introduction ==
In the Rider-Waite-Smith tarot deck, illustrated by Pamela Colman Smith and first published in 1909, the Ace of Wands depicts a hand emerging from a cloud and holding a leafy wooden staff. A landscape with hills and a distant castle appears beneath the wand. The illustration forms part of Smith's designs for the Minor Arcana, which departed from the simpler arrangements to suit symbols found in many earlier tarot decks.

Tarot's pictorial symbolism has been interpreted as representing intellectual, moral, and spiritual themes associated with human experience across different historical periods, geographic regions, and cultures. Its symbolism has also been compared to Martin Buber's philosophical concept of the "I-Thou" relationship, which describes the relationship between the self and the other.

The Ace of Wands is one of the 56 Minor Arcana in a standard 78-card tarot deck. It belongs to the suit of Wands, one of four suits alongside Cups, Swords, and Pentacles. In tarot divination, the cards has traditionally been associated with beginnings, creativity and enterprise. This card in a reading can signify success in all aspects. The success is backed by luck. This combination of success backed by hard work and luck is what forms the basis of the Ace card in the Tarot deck.

The element of the wands suit is fire. The key words are Passion, New Ventures, Success, good luck. Therefore, wands are enthusiastic, inspirational, and spiritually minded. Wands correspond to the zodiac signs Aries, Leo, and Sagittarius. The four suits, related to the modern hearts, clubs, diamonds, and spades, are swords, cups, pentacles, and wands.

An Ace-Ace pair shows that a new spirit is entering one's life. It draws on the energy of the Ace of Wands: creativity, excitement, adventure, courage, personal power.

== History ==
The Minor Arcana consists of the suit cards. The leading French occultist of the late 19th and 20th centuries, who wrote under the name of Papus, rebuked certain of his colleagues for using only the Major Arcana for divination, and insisted that the entire pack is essential; and all occult theories of those whom Papus rebuked were in better accord than he with the true facts of the matter. The suit cards are in no way special to the tarot pack; its inventor can have imbued it at most the trump card with esoteric meanings, since the others were not of his invention, but only rather faithful copies of the Islamic cards from which European ones were derived.

== Description and imagery ==
There are different versions of the Ace of Wands as well as different interpretations of their meaning.

One is that a hand comes out from a cloud holding a flowering wand. In the distance is a mountain peak surmounted by a castle.

Another says that the image found on the Ace of Wands card is the rod with which Moses used to strike the water out of the rock or the club of Hercules.

== Meanings and interpretations ==
=== Upright ===
In The Pictorial Key to the Tarot (1910), Arthur Edward Waite associated the upright Ace of Wands with creation, invention, enterprise and new beginnings. His interpretations also included birth, family, origins and, in some traditions, money or inheritance.

=== Reversed ===
Waite associated the reversed Ace of Wands with decline, loss and ruin, as well as diminished joy. These interpretations reflect the early 20th-century divinatory tradition described in his work.

=== Work ===
Tarot readers often interpret the Ace of Wands as a sign of new and positive future, especially in the area of occupation.

=== Love ===
If the reader is single, this card may be seen as the indication of the beginning of a new romantic relationship. If one is already committed, the Ace tells that the relationship will undergo a 'new beginning,' and those in it will rise to new levels of understanding each other.

=== Finances ===
The appearance of this card has been interpreted as the sign of a turn for the better in terms of fortune and wealth, and sometimes it can even indicate gifts of money, or inheritance from unexpected sources.

=== Health ===
Readers often see this card as alluding to new, positive levels of health and vitality.

=== Spirituality ===
As mind and body are closely linked, this card can indicate a new spiritual influence coming into one's life.
