= King of Wands =

Tarot card of the Minor Arcana

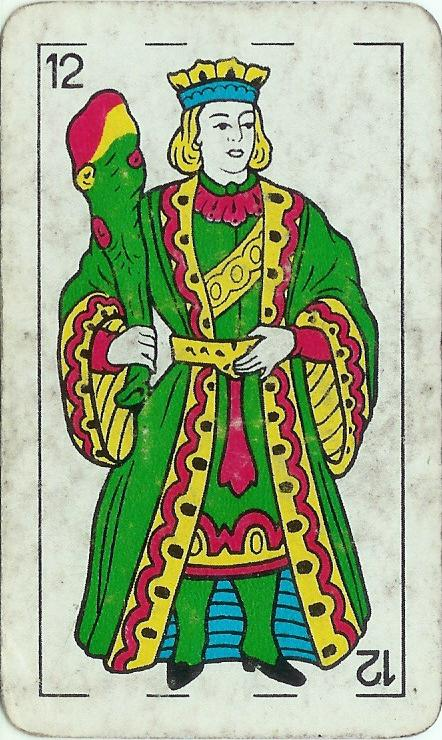
King of Batons ("bastos") from a Spanish deck

The King of Wands, or King of Batons, is a card used in Latin-suited playing cards which include Italian, Spanish, and tarot decks. It is part of what tarot card readers call the "Minor Arcana".

Tarot cards are used throughout much of Europe to play tarot card games. In English-speaking countries, where the games are largely unknown, tarot cards came to be utilized primarily for divinatory purposes.

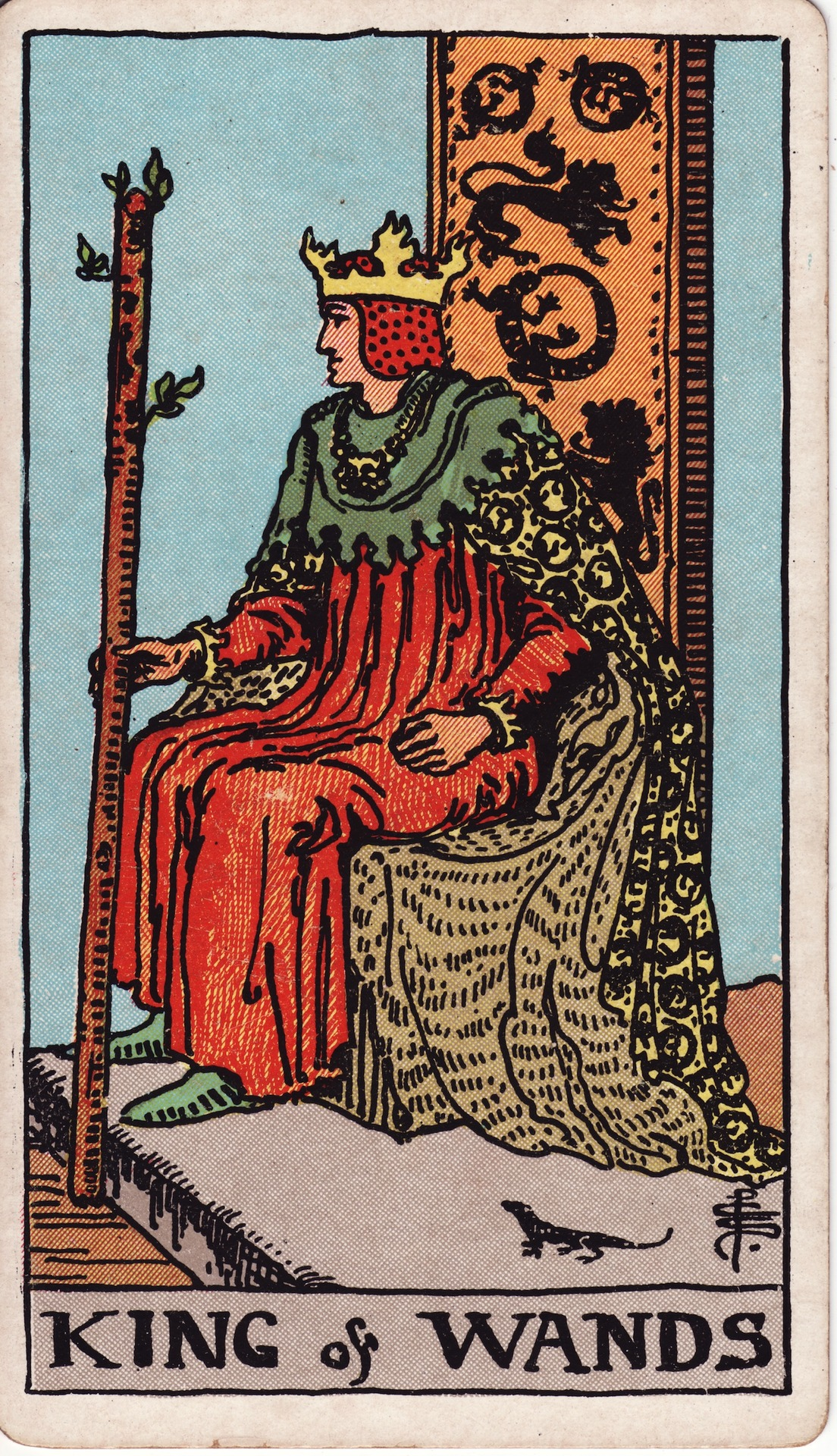
King of Wands from the Rider–Waite tarot deck

== Key meanings ==
The key meanings of the King of Wands:

- Authority figure
- Financial gain
- Honest and trustworthy
- Mediation
- Professional
