= Two of Wands =

Tarot card of the Minor Arcana

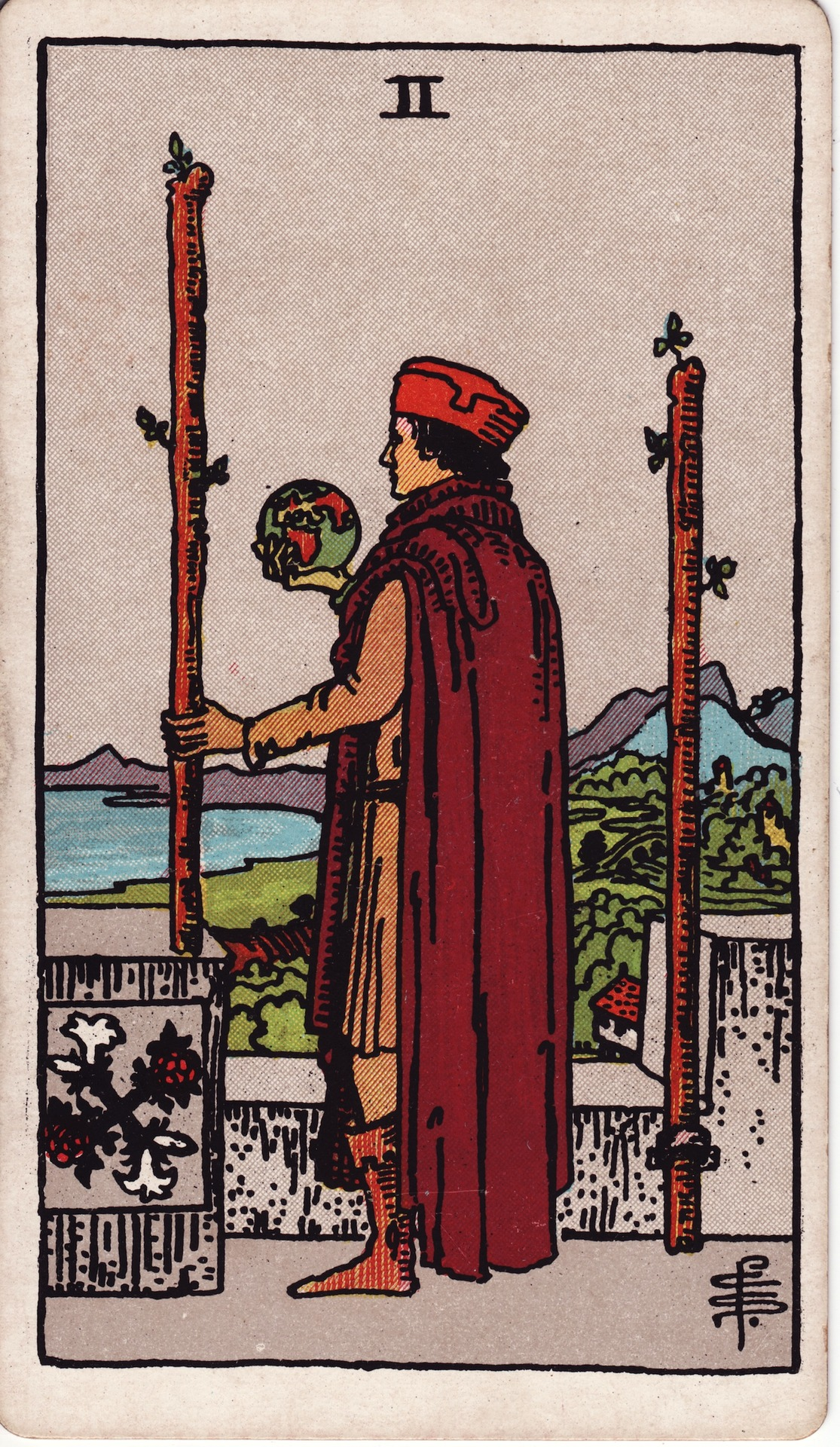
Two of Wands from the Rider–Waite Tarot deck

The Two of Wands is a Minor Arcana tarot card.

Tarot cards are used throughout much of Europe to play tarot card games. In English-speaking countries, where the games are largely unknown, tarot cards came to be utilized primarily for divinatory purposes.

== Divination usage ==
Most often, the Two of Wands card means courage and daring. It has the message of striking out on a journey or new path.

The image on the Rider-Waite deck shows us a wealthy merchant or noble, looking out at his territory, or perhaps for his ships that have set sail. He holds the world in his hands, symbolizing power.

The time is right to be bold and creative. If you are in a moment of doubt, this card tells you to make your move. You have the power in your hands; now is the time to find courage to use it.

== Key meanings ==
The key meanings of the Two of Wands:

- Achievement
- Anxiety
- Gain
- Goals
- Partnership
