= Seven of Wands =

Tarot card of the Minor Arcana

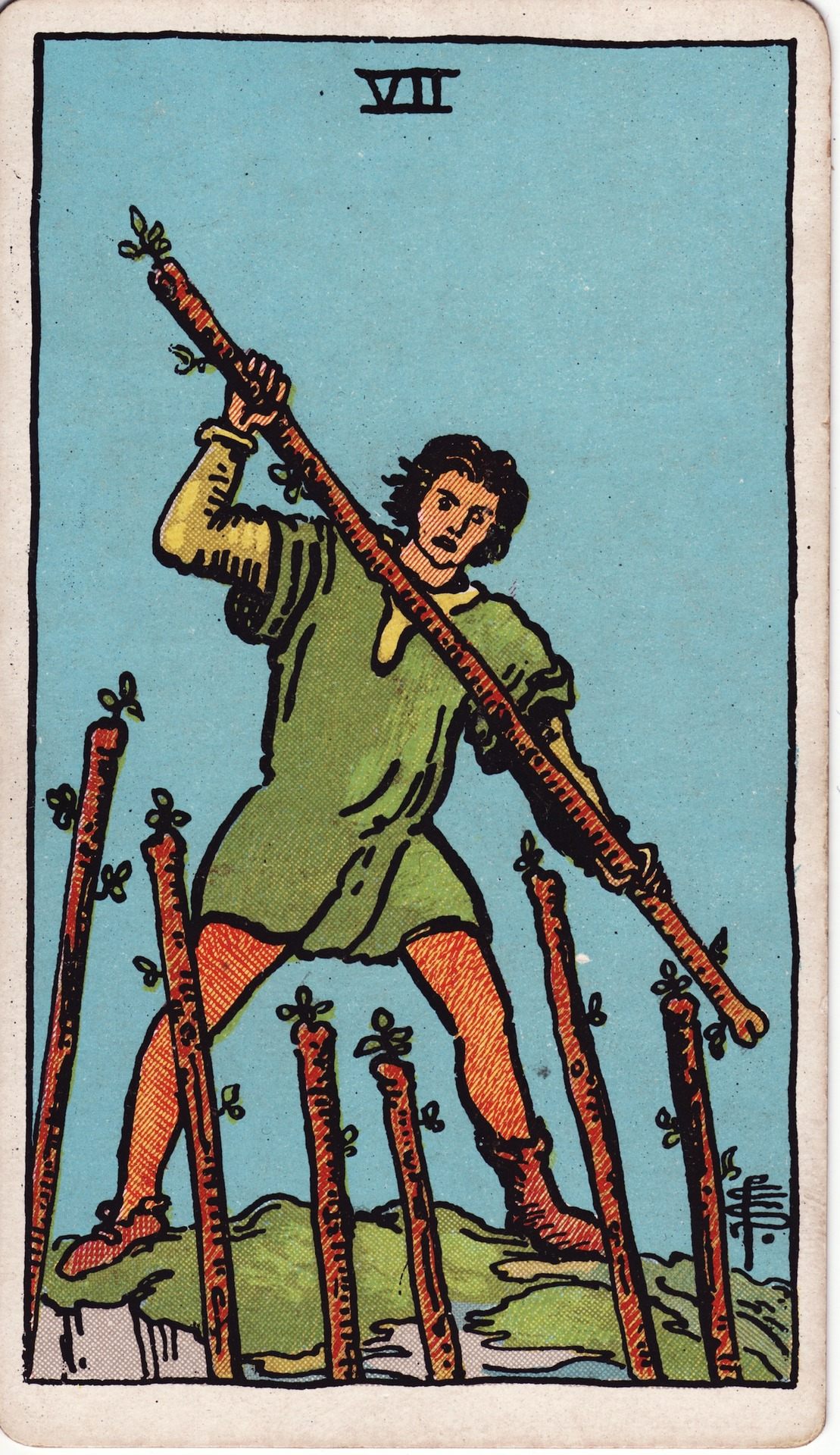
Seven of Wands from the Rider–Waite tarot deck

The Seven of Wands is a Minor Arcana tarot card.

Tarot cards are used throughout much of Europe to play tarot card games. In English-speaking countries, where the games are largely unknown, tarot cards came to be utilized primarily for divinatory purposes.

== Rider–Waite symbolism ==
In the Rider-Waite deck, the person braces themselves in a defensive pose against the other wands prodding in his direction. Looking strained and stressed, but standing firm, he appears to stand on a hill, or straddle a mountain range, to symbolise his strong footing. The seven of wands defender stands ready for battle. It is about defending the footing gained. It is the ability to cultivate the struggles at hand into a stronger position. He stands alone against a multitude, but perseveres. It is he alone who maintains the fight and is not beaten.
