= Nine of Wands =

Tarot card of the Minor Arcana

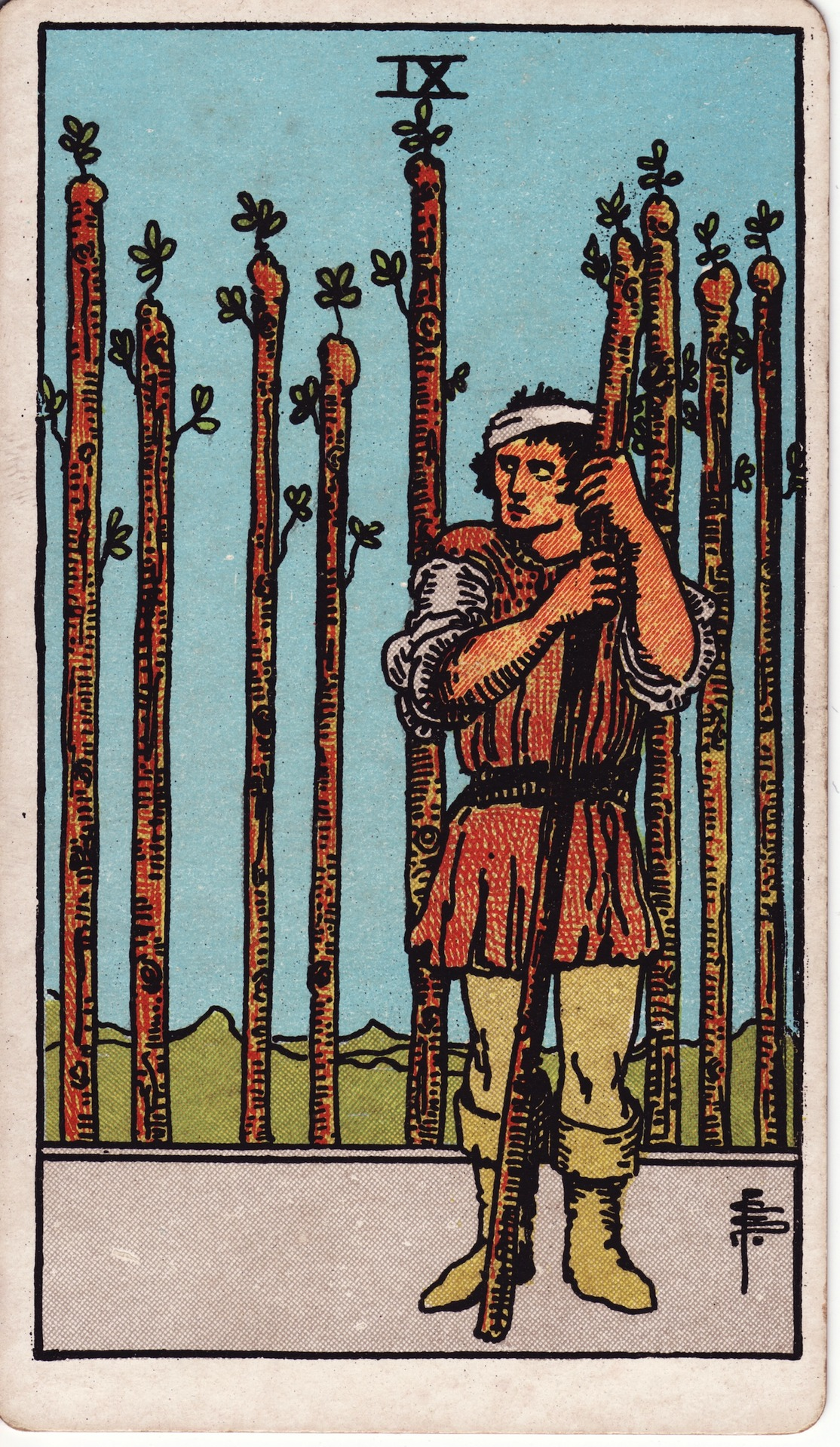
Nine of Wands from the Rider–Waite tarot deck

The Nine of Wands is a Minor Arcana tarot card.

Tarot cards are used throughout much of Europe to play tarot card games. In English-speaking countries, where the games are largely unknown, tarot cards came to be utilized primarily for divinatory purposes.

== Divinatory purposes ==
This card depicts a figure, weary from battle yet prepared to fight on. It indicates order, discipline and an unassailable position, courage in the face of attack or adversity, a stability that cannot be removed, good health, and that any opposition will be defeated.

Dignified or reversed – Lack or inability to give and take, projects pursued that are destined to fail because of their impractical nature, and delays. This card could also indicate possible poor or ill health, a secure position that may crumble.

== Key meanings ==
The key meanings of the Nine of Wands:

- Afraid
- Cautious
- Defensive
- Impermanent security
- Inner strength
- Persistence
- Resilience

== Astrological correspondence ==
The Nine of Wands is associated to the Moon in Sagittarius.
