= Four of Wands =

Tarot card of the Minor Arcana

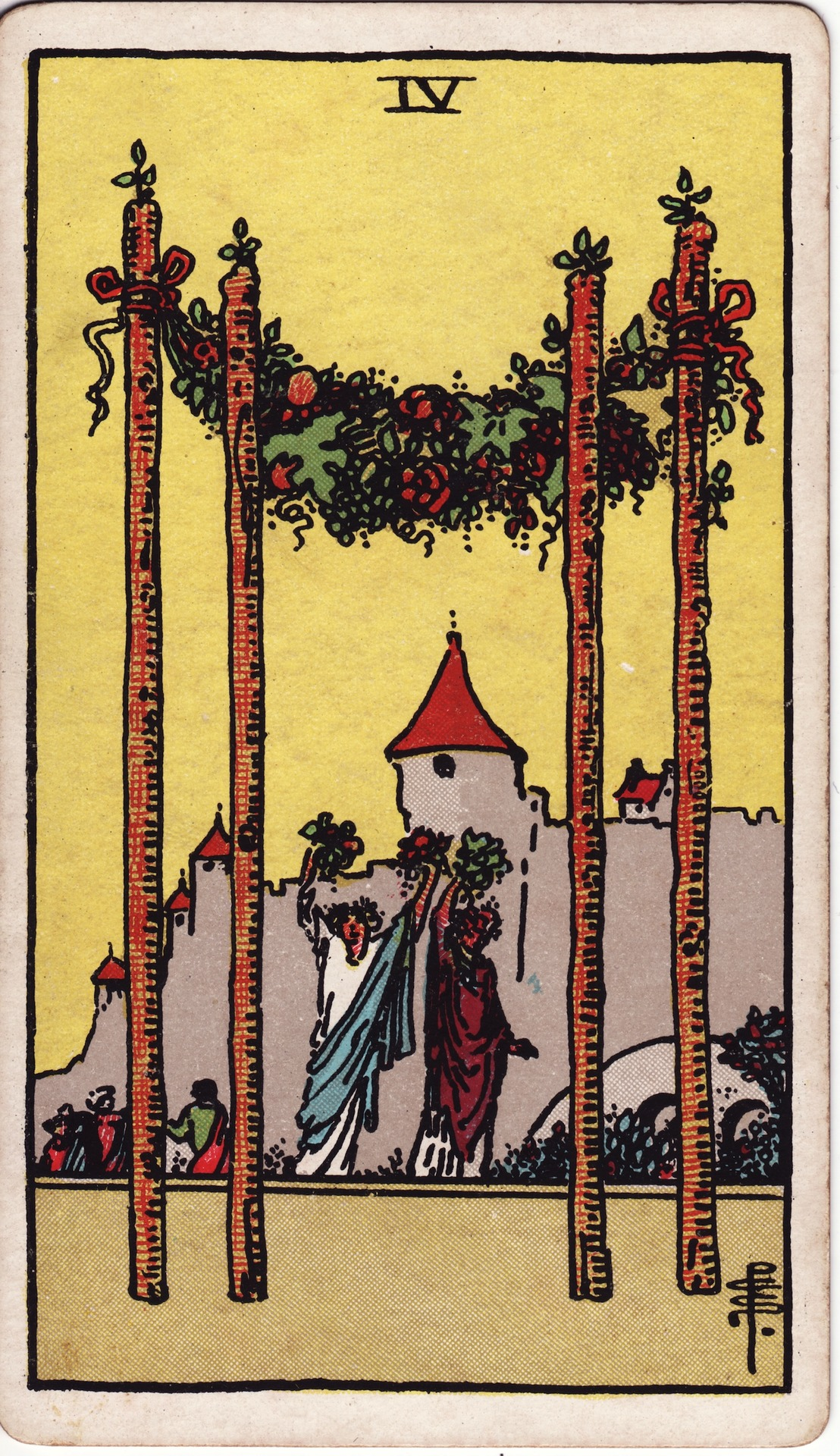
Four of Wands from the Rider–Waite tarot deck

The Four of Wands is a card used in Latin-suited playing cards which include tarot decks. It is part of what tarot card readers call the "Minor Arcana".

Tarot cards are used throughout much of Europe to play tarot card games. In English-speaking countries, where the games are largely unknown, tarot cards came to be utilized primarily for divinatory purposes.

== Rider–Waite symbolism ==
- The structure in the front resembles a Jewish wedding chuppah, although it is not covered by a cloth as is traditional in that faith. In fact, it is covered with netting intertwined with fruits, in the manner of a Samaritan Jewish sukkah prepared for a harvest festival.
- The four wands' structure appears stable enough to stand on its own, unlike several other cards, in which some wands have to be held.
- Decorative garlanding hangs across the tops of the four poles, bearing summer fruits, especially grapes and peaches.
- The people in this card appear somewhat distant from the wands, unlike the people appearing in other cards of this suit. There seems to be a lot going on in the background.
- The persons closer to the structure seem quite enthusiastic, as they wave "nosegays" (according to PKT), bouquets of flowers up in the air. Their gestures are also reminiscent of the celebration of Sukkot, in which celebrants hold bunches of plant matter up in praise of God.
- In the background of the card appears what looks like large city walls, although in the PKT Waite refers to it as "an old manorial house".

== Divination usage ==
This card is generally considered positive. It is said to reflect harmony and positive feelings, hard work with good results. According to Waite, it is country life, haven of refuge, a species of domestic harvest-home, repose, concord, harmony, prosperity, peace, and the perfected work of these.

== Key meanings ==
The key meanings of the Four of Wands:

- Celebrations and happiness
- Completion
- Harmony
- New beginnings
- Pleasure
