= Page of Wands =

Tarot card of the Minor Arcana

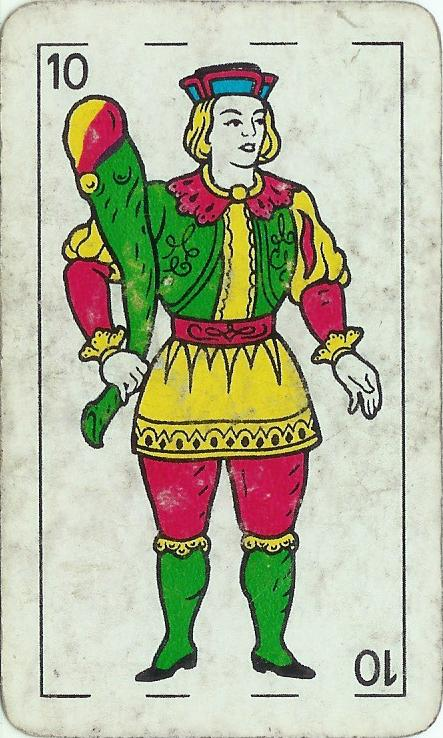
Knave of batons ("bastos") from a Spanish deck

The Page of Wands (or jack or knave of wands or batons) is a card used in Latin-suited playing cards which include tarot decks. It is part of what tarot card readers call the Minor Arcana.

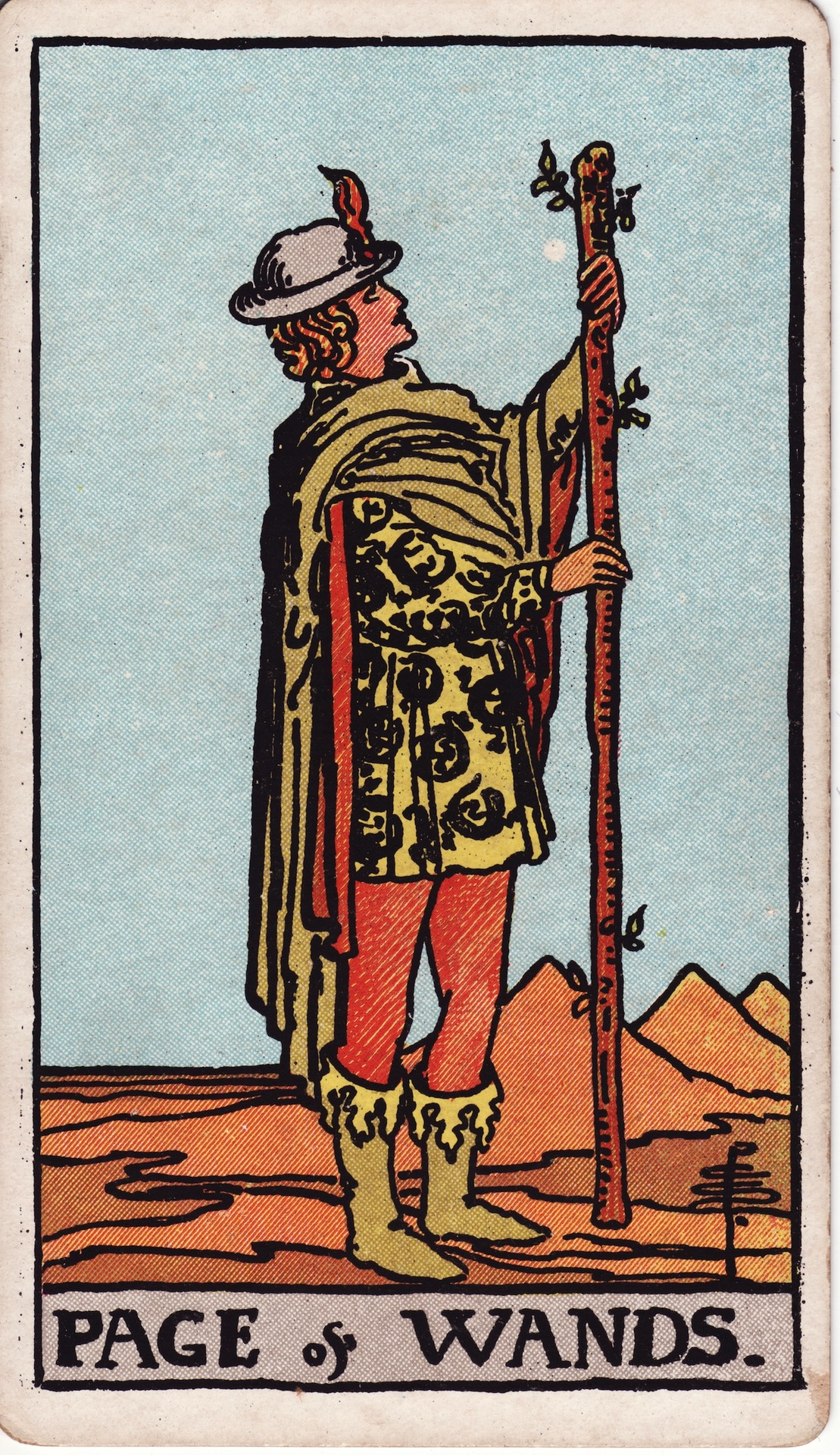
Page of Wands from the Rider–Waite tarot deck

Tarot cards are used throughout much of Europe to play tarot card games. In English-speaking countries, where the games are largely unknown, tarot cards came to be utilized primarily for divinatory purposes.

== Divination usage ==
"The page lives where the wand, or the flame, is larger than the person. The drive is larger than life's experiences. The thirst for action and the yearning for progress has put you squarely in front of the task so that you can grow beyond your limit." (Evelin Burger)

== Key meanings ==
The key meanings of the Page of Wands:

- Adventurous
- Ambitious
- Energetic and active
- New beginnings
- Skilled

When comparing what a person wants to "move" and what is "moving" them, experiences become less important. That is the danger, and yet it is also a chance. Don't "lose" yourself and don't lose your chance. When this card appears, it's time for a new beginning that will bring someone to the point where they discover the true power and energy of their own fire and personal power.

Upon being born a person is filled with drives, will power and desire. This is the perfect time to re-discover life, playfully conquering and greeting success and defeat, all events and experience with great enthusiasm.

This card is also considered the 'messenger' card. When it is in a spread, it is highly likely that you will receive important news.

== Symbolism ==
- The wand that the page is holding has leaves sprouting from its tip, representing growth, change (from stick to leaves) and fertility.
- The figure is looking upwards, representing optimism and joy, drive.
- The desert around him is symbolic of the corresponding element fire and your own "fire". It is at the same time symbolic of the fact that you must not get lost, that you can't "lose" yourself.
- The Egyptian pyramids are represented in the background, symbolising exploration of far-off lands and new territories (from the mind of the European illustrator), either physically or metaphorically so.
- He is a young man, a page, showing that you must be playful and enthusiastic.
- He seems to be examining the wand, as if re-discovering it, showing us the need to re-discover our joy and playfulness.
- His clothes are adorned with salamanders, an agile animal which is representing the element of fire as it was thought to be able to walk through fire.
