= Five of Wands =

Tarot card of the Minor Arcana

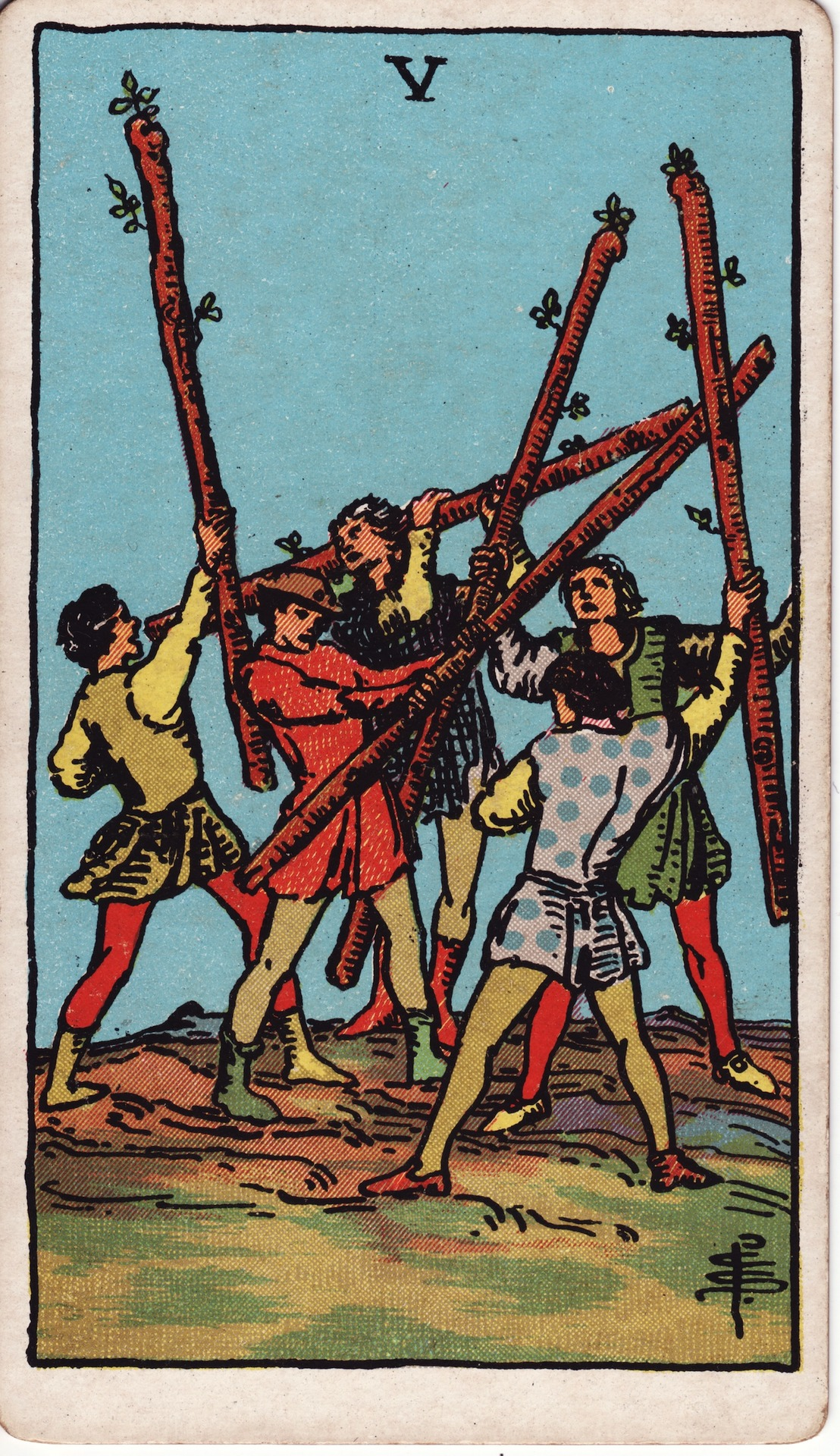
Five of Wands from the Rider–Waite tarot deck

Five of Wands or Five of Batons is a card used in Latin-suited playing cards which include tarot decks. It is part of what tarot card readers call the "Minor Arcana".

Tarot cards are used throughout much of Europe to play tarot card games. In English-speaking countries, where the games are largely unknown, tarot cards came to be utilized primarily for divinatory purposes.

== Description ==
A posse of youths are brandishing staves (wands), as if in sport or strife.

== Key meanings ==
The key meanings of the Five of Wands:

- Anxiety
- Conflict
- Disagreement
- Solidarity
- Completion
