= Suit of swords =

Tarot card suit

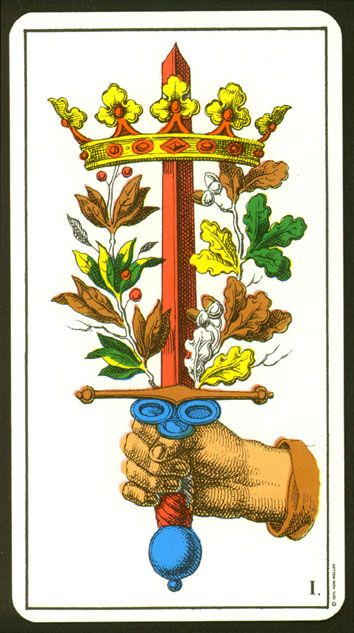
- Ace of Swords from the 1JJ Tarot deck
- Deck: Minor Arcana

The suit of swords is one of the four suits of the Minor Arcana in a 78-card cartomantic tarot deck. It is derived from the suit used in Latin-suited playing cards, such as Spanish, Italian and Latin-suited tarot decks. Like the other tarot suits, it contains fourteen cards: ace (one), two through ten, page, knight, queen and king. Occultists claim that the suit represents the Second Estate (The Nobles).

While tarot cards are used throughout much of Europe to play tarot card games, in English-speaking countries, where the games are largely unknown, tarot cards came much later to be utilized primarily for divinatory purposes.

== Divinatory and occult meanings ==
In divination, the suit of swords is associated with masculinity and intellect, but also sorrow and misfortune. The element of air has been associated with the suit. Etteilla and Samuel Liddell MacGregor Mathers equated Swords to the suit of Spades in the French pack.

=== Cards in the suit of Swords ===
- The Ace of Swords indicates decisive ability. Cutting through confusion. Taking a radical decision or standpoint. The ability to see through deception, and expose it.
- The Two of Swords indicates doubt over decisions. A sense of powerlessness and apathy giving way to fear. If the other cards in the spread are favourable, then the Two of Swords can indicate lack of bias and even-mindedness.
- The Three of Swords represents the aspect of the mind which is overly critical, especially of itself. The perverse impulse to dissect a problem beyond the point of usefulness. The three swords are often depicted piercing a bleeding heart. The swords symbolize the intellect, and the heart, the emotions which always suffer under this treatment.
- The Four of Swords symbolizes avoidance. Setting problems to the side, (the swords on the wall), while one prays for deliverance. This card can also represent surrender, or in some cases, pacifism.
- The Five of Swords symbolizes victory by betrayal. The emptiness which descends after a harsh struggle. The alienation of others through belligerence.
- The Six of Swords represents a dangerous journey. Readers do not always agree on the alignment of this card. It can indicate a doomed endeavor, or conversely, moving out of troubled waters. It also indicates responsibility for others.
- The Seven of Swords represents covert activities. The attempt to get away with too much, and being compromised as a result. If the reading is favourable, the card may represent making sacrifices to move ahead. Simplifying. It can also mean manipulative or dishonest behavior at play.
- The Eight of Swords symbolizes feeling trapped and oppressed by others, and powerless to change. Often the condition is self-imposed, but the cause is attributed to external influences. This card can also indicate the stubborn adherence to an ideal.
- The Nine of Swords can represent being plagued by fear, guilt, doubt, and worries that are to a large extent, unfounded. However, it can indicate the process of letting go of grief and, in combination with healing cards like the Queen of Wands, it can be highly beneficial.
- The Ten of Swords is a relief from the nightmare of the Nine of Swords. There may be exhaustion, and the result may not be ideal but the ordeal is over and the truth has been outed. The Ten of Swords can also indicate the end of a repetitious cycle. Divorce.
- The Page of Swords represents the ability to observe others keenly, while concealing one's own nature. The talent for keeping secrets. Keeping one's head in the face of danger. The ability to endure suspense.
- The Knight of Swords is wrath, impatience, fanaticism, or blind addiction to action as opposed to thought. Also may indicate initiative and courage.
- The Queen of Swords symbolizes independence, at its best. Power, intelligence, tactical thinking. The ability to streamline a problem, and find the solution without fuss. At worst, The Queen of Swords can represent isolation, depression and cruelty.
- The King of Swords is discipline with passion. Power and insight. Can symbolize tyranny.

== Card images in the Rider–Waite tarot deck ==
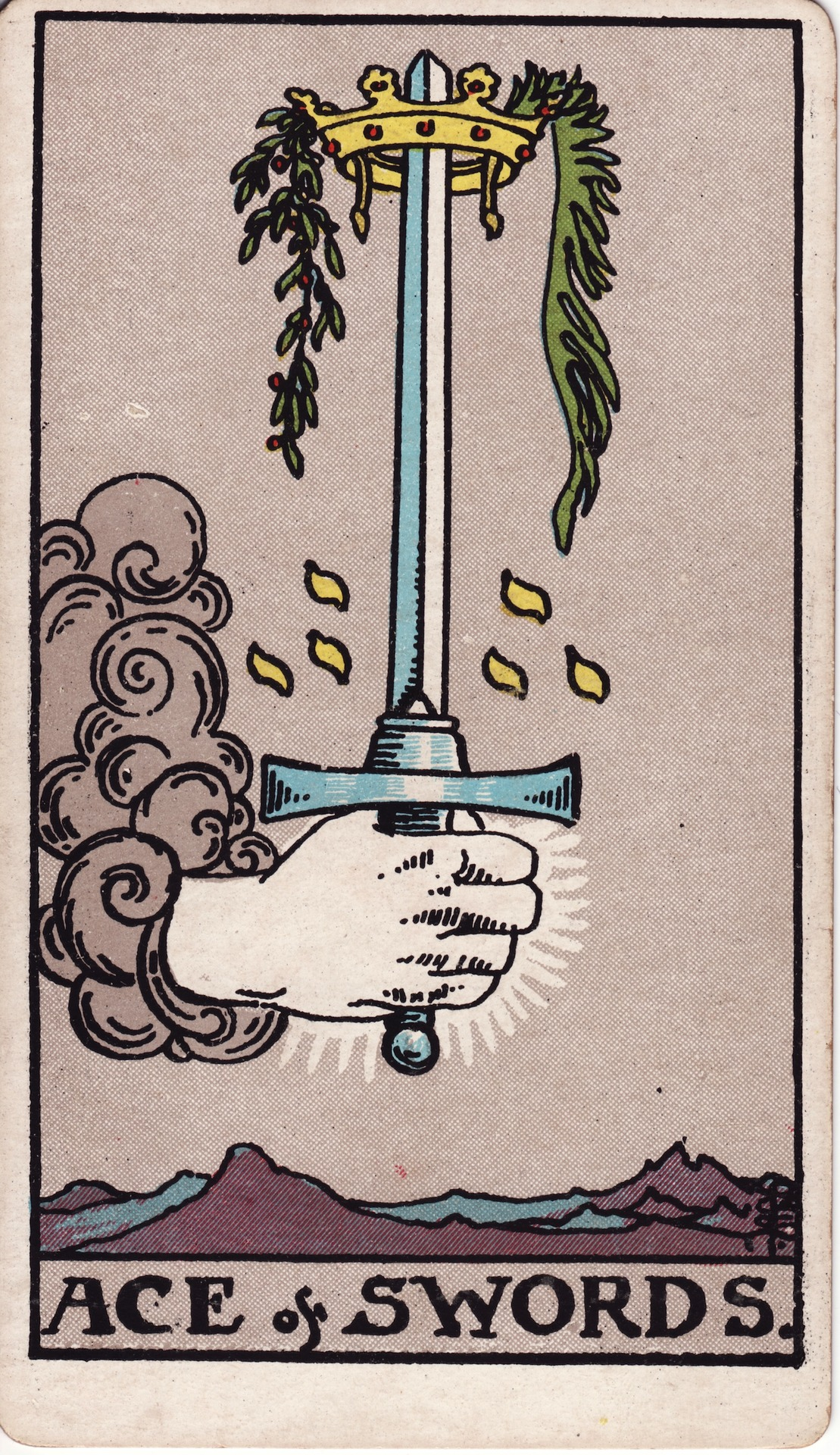
Ace of Swords

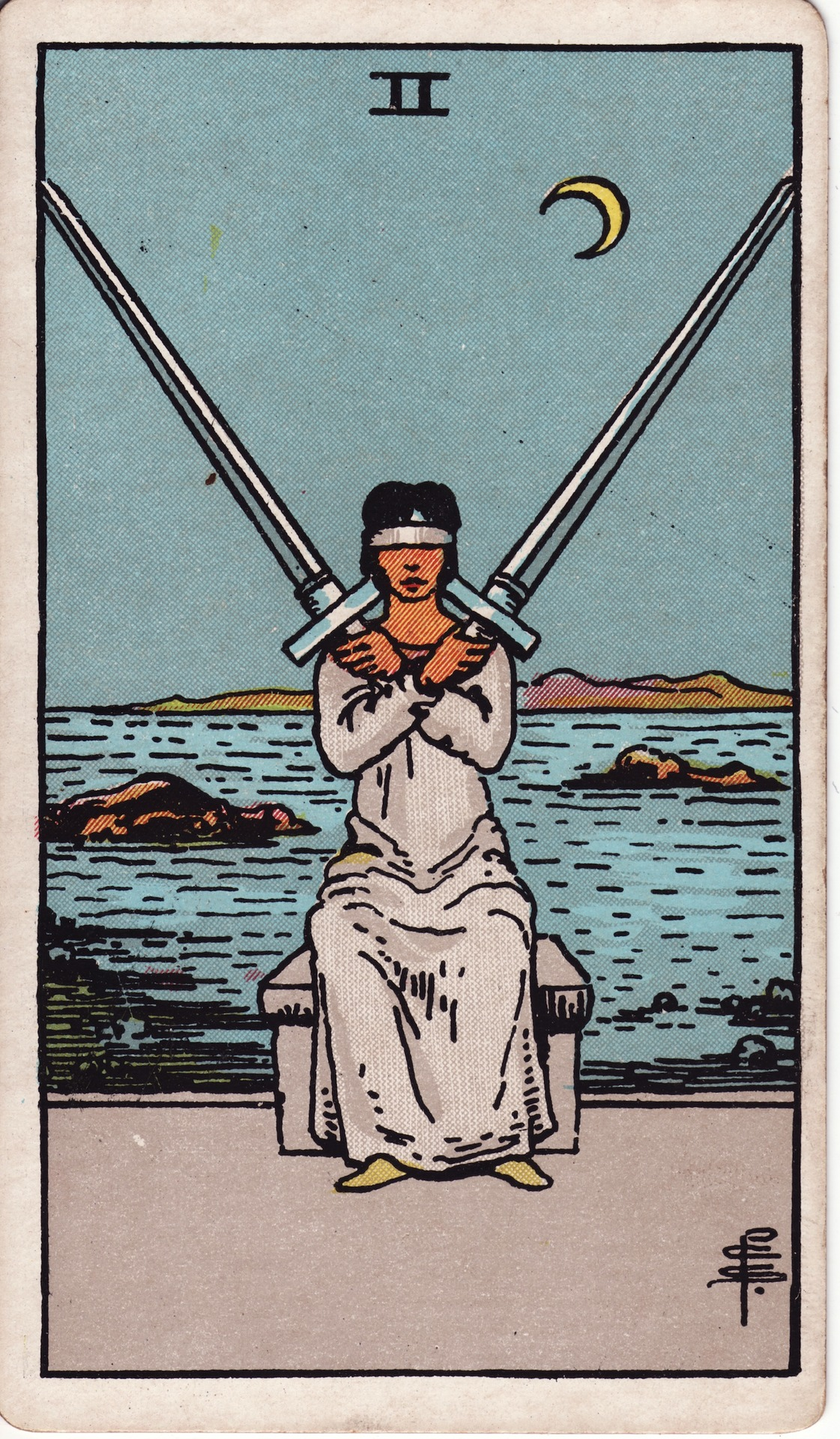
Two of Swords

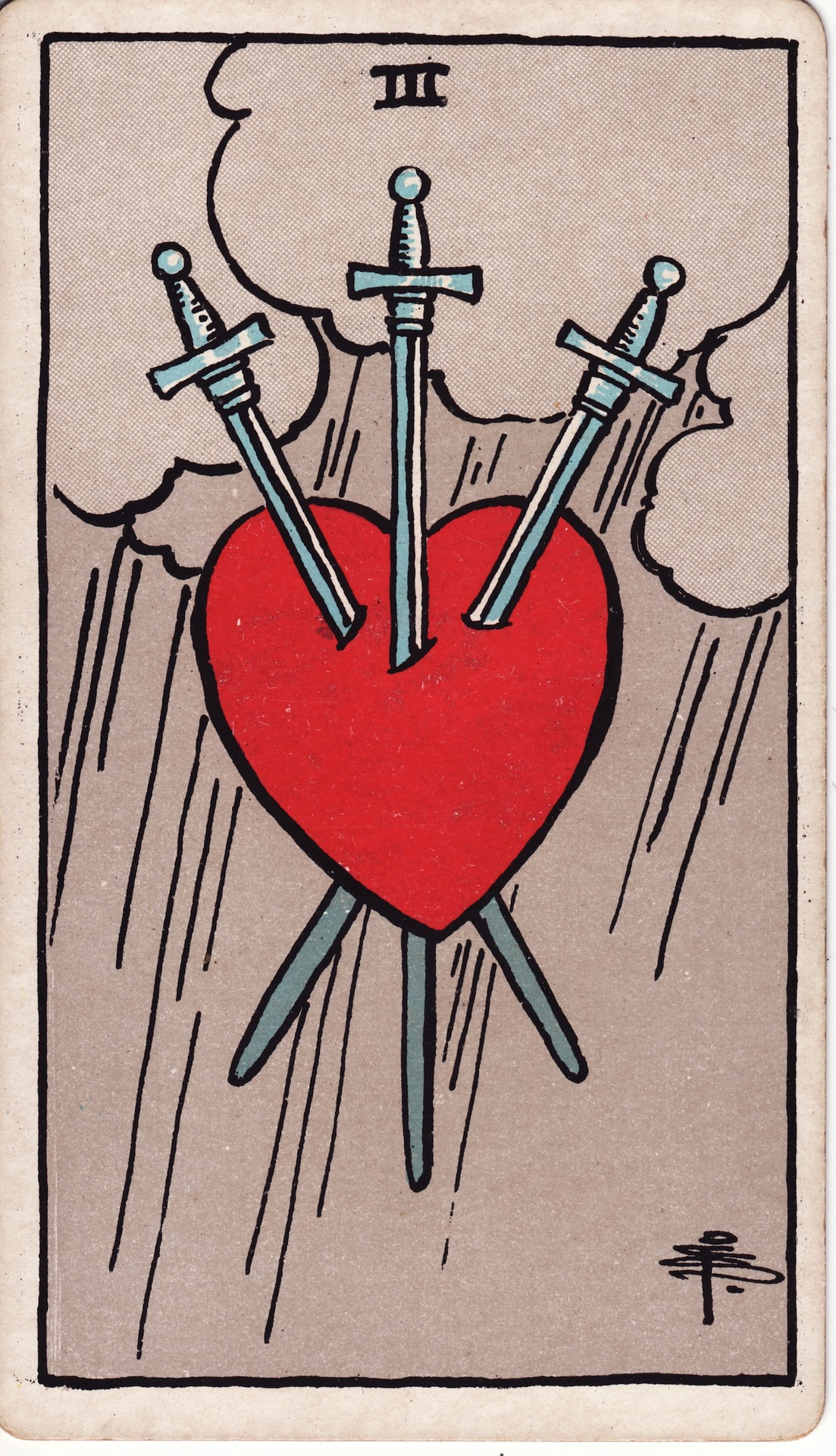
Three of Swords

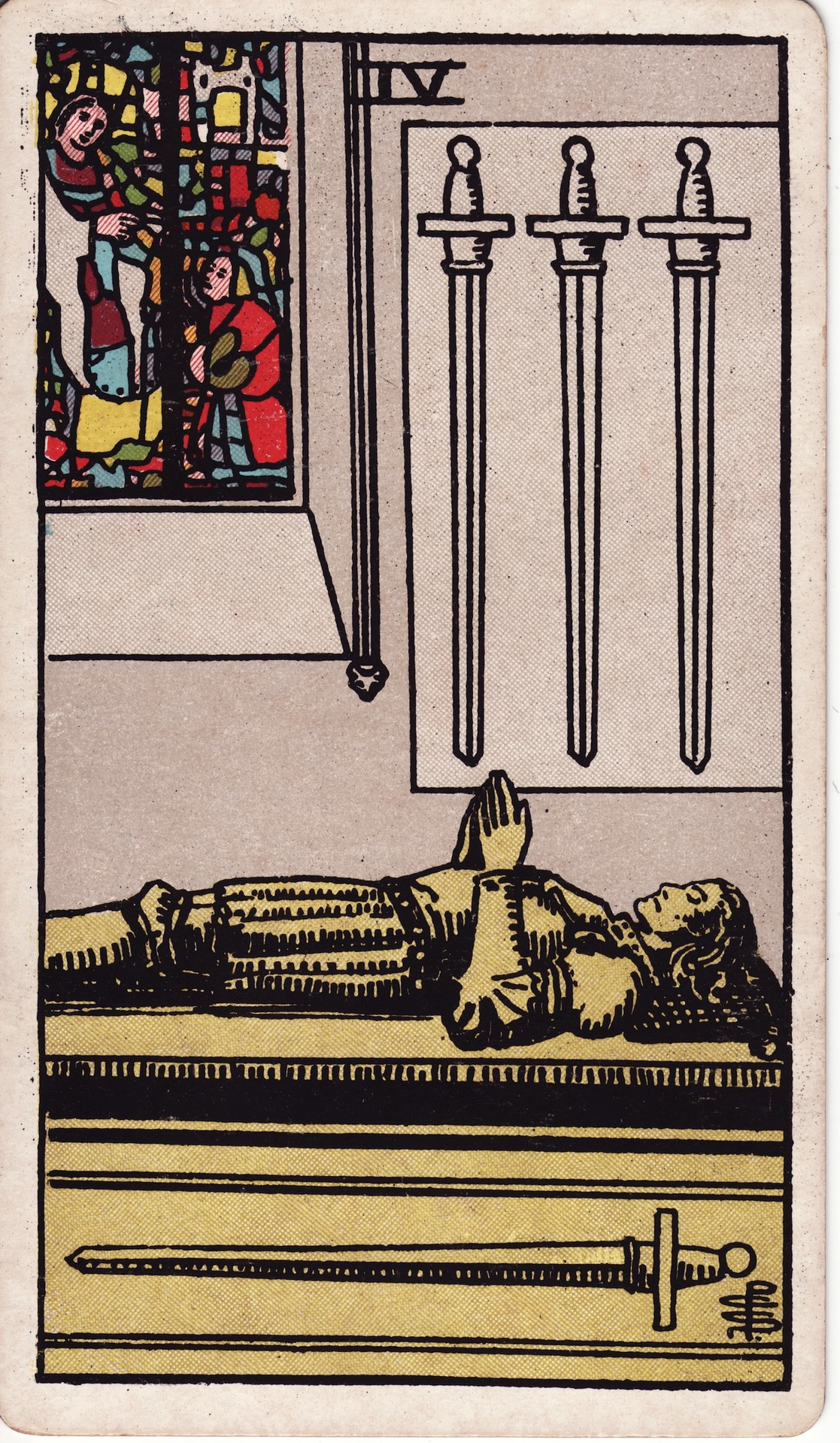
Four of Swords

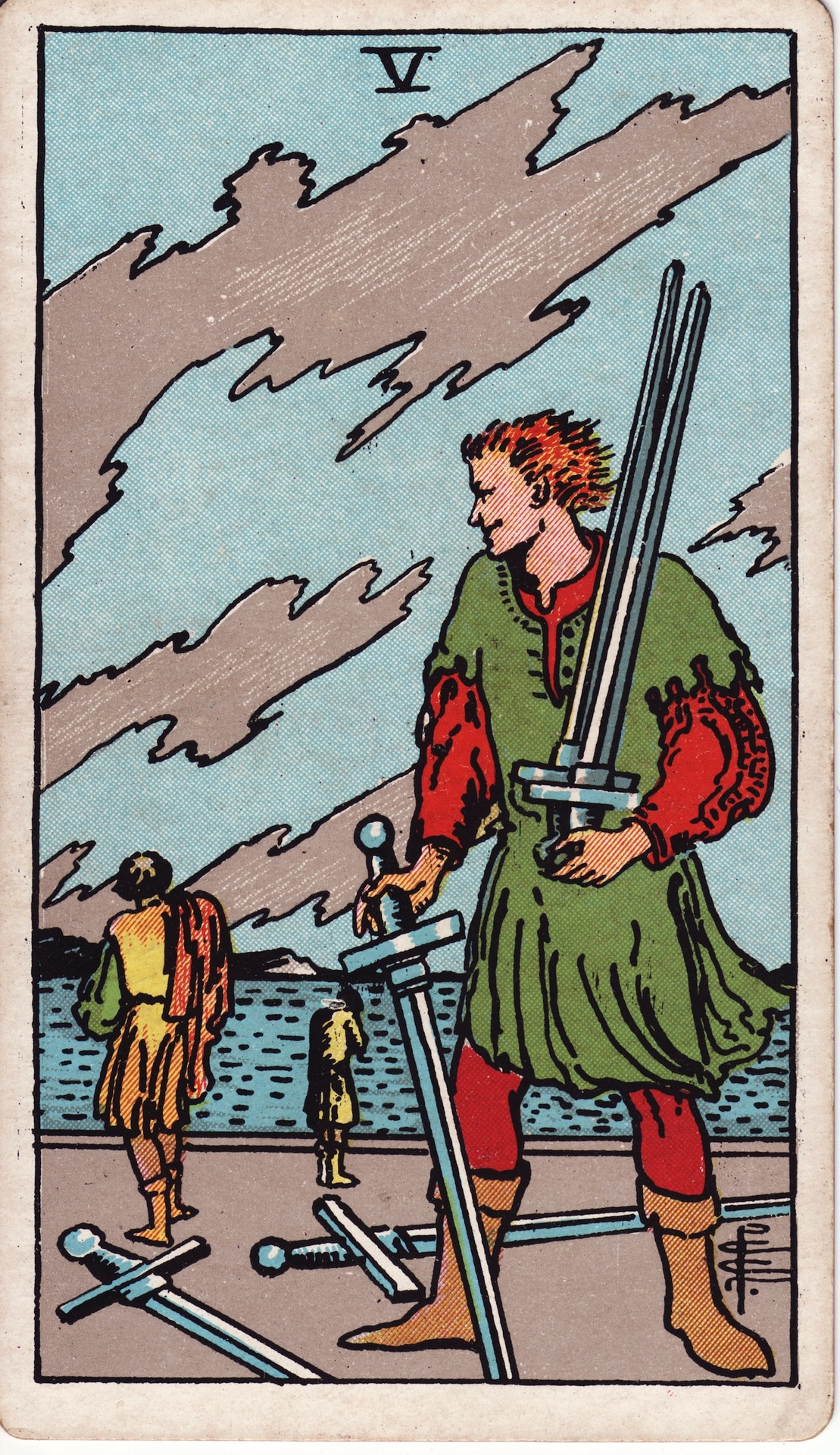
Five of Swords

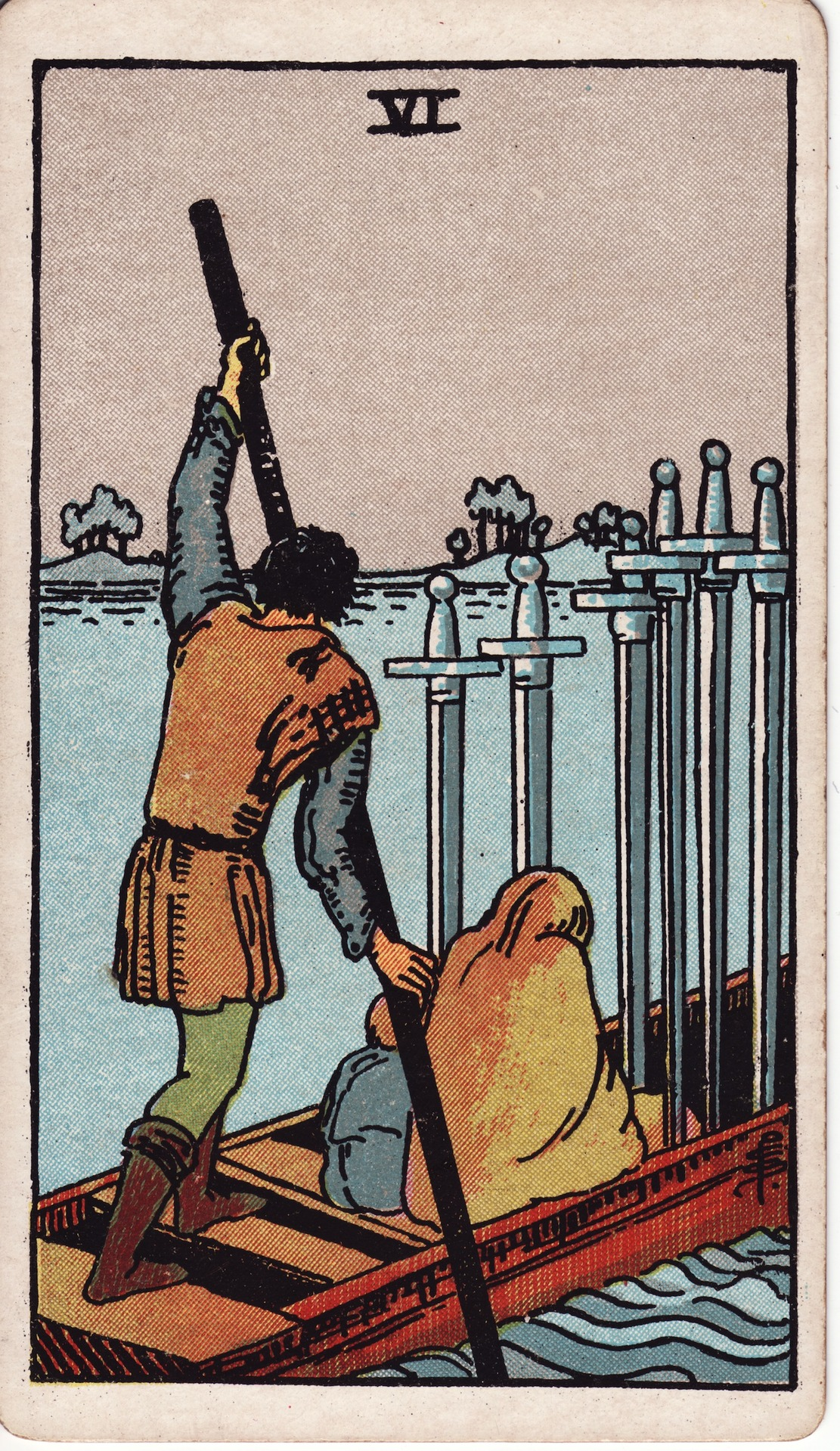
Six of Swords

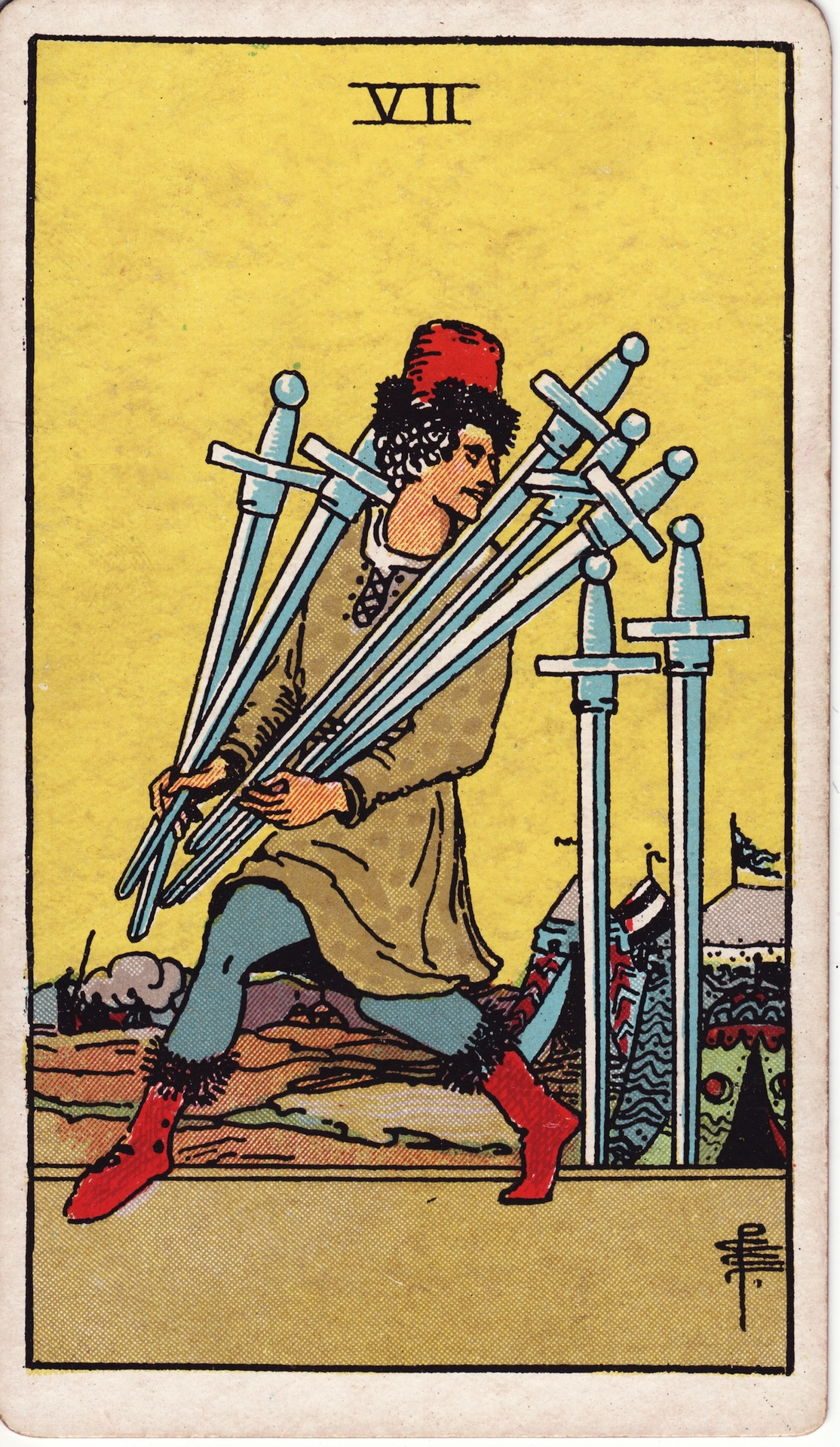
Seven of Swords

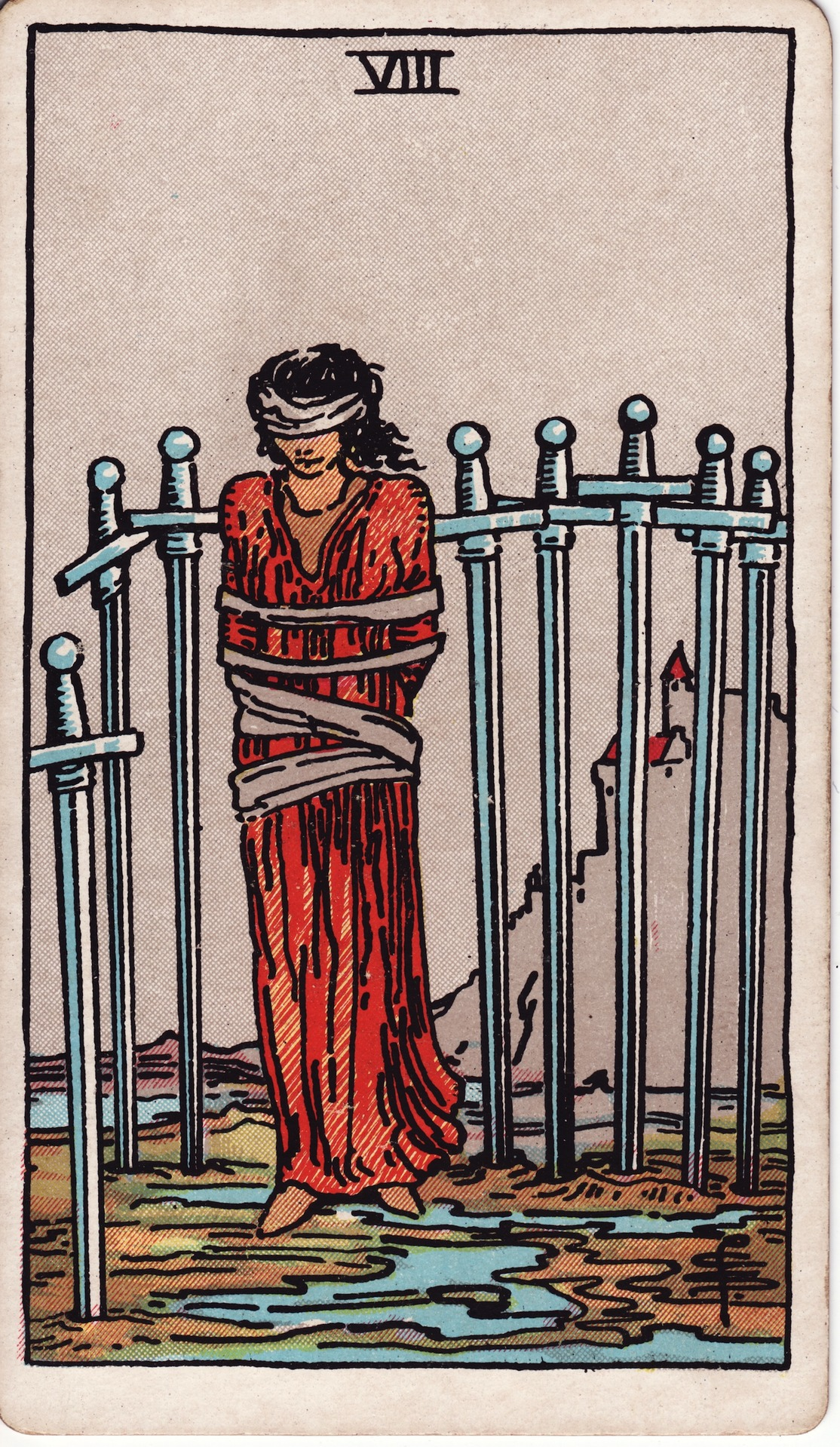
Eight of Swords

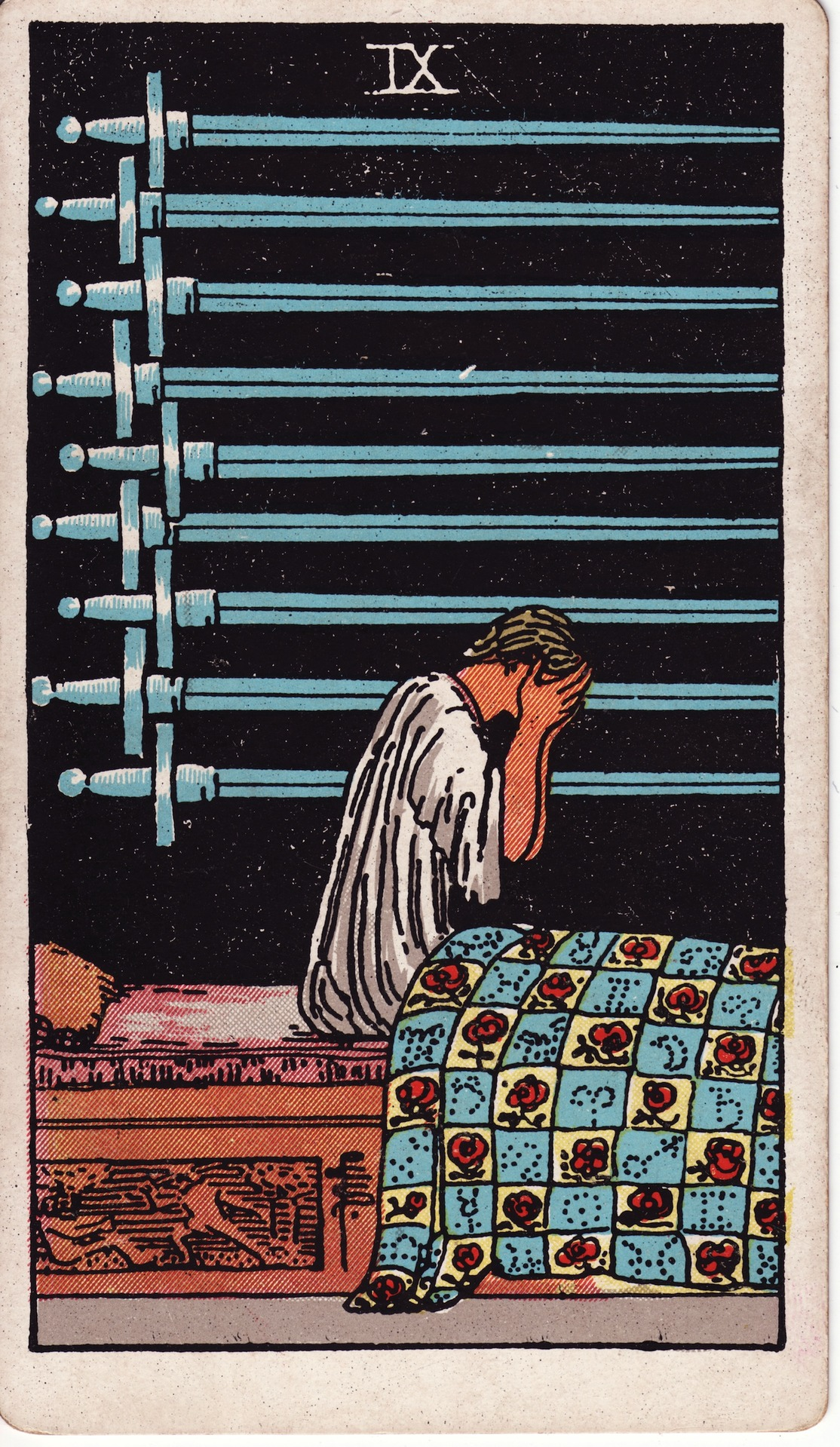
Nine of Swords

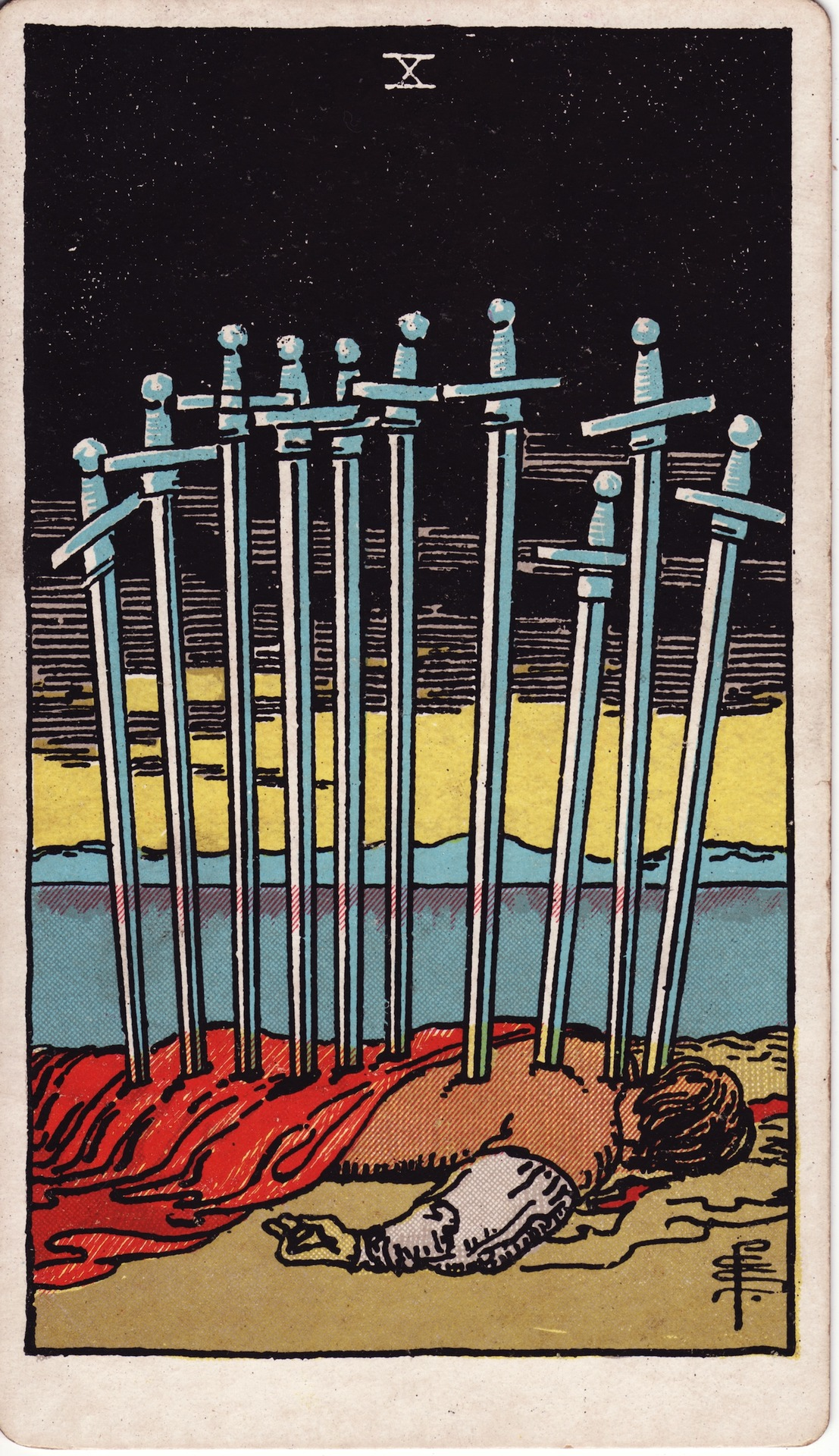
Ten of Swords

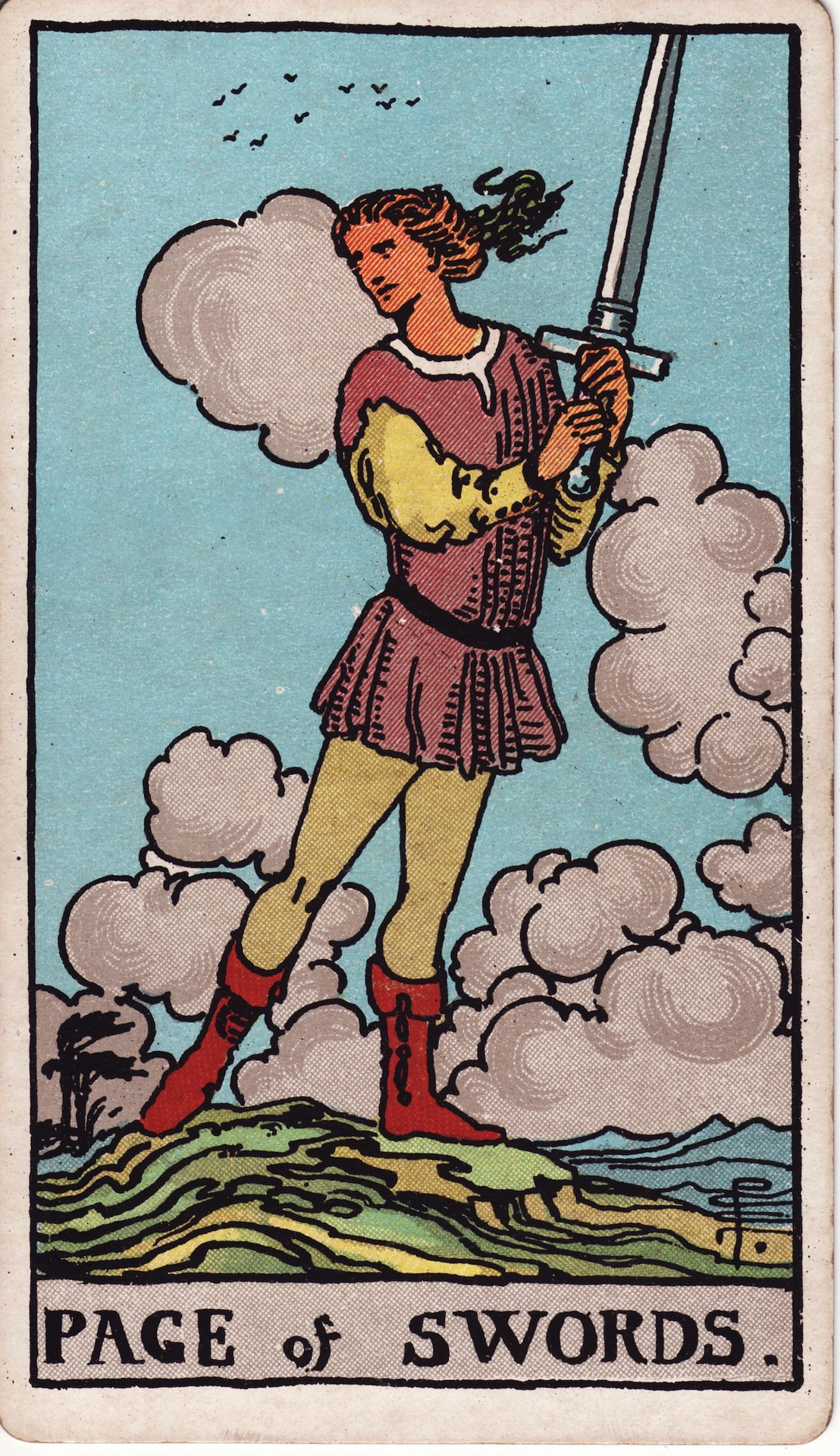
Page of Swords

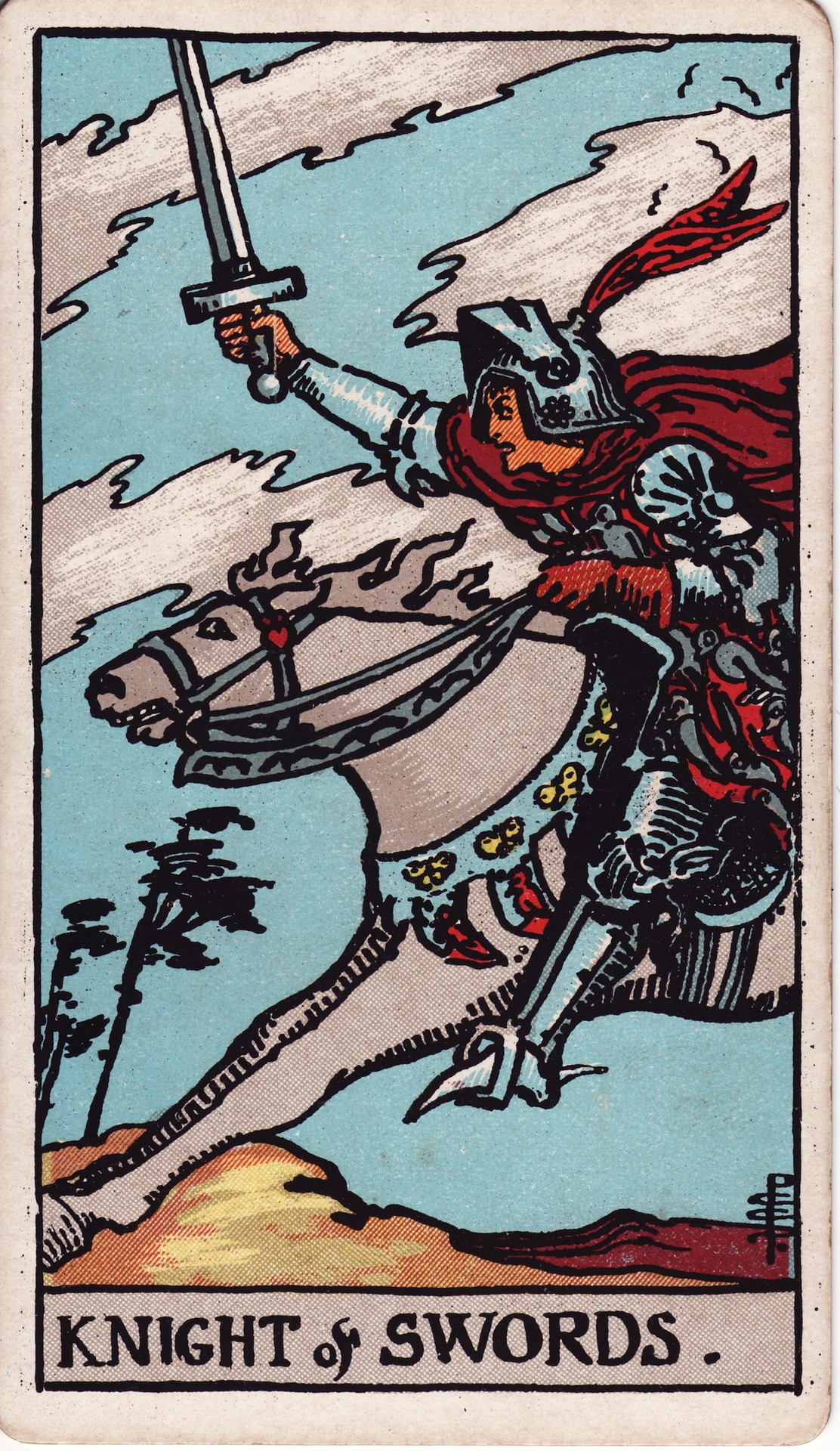
Knight of Swords

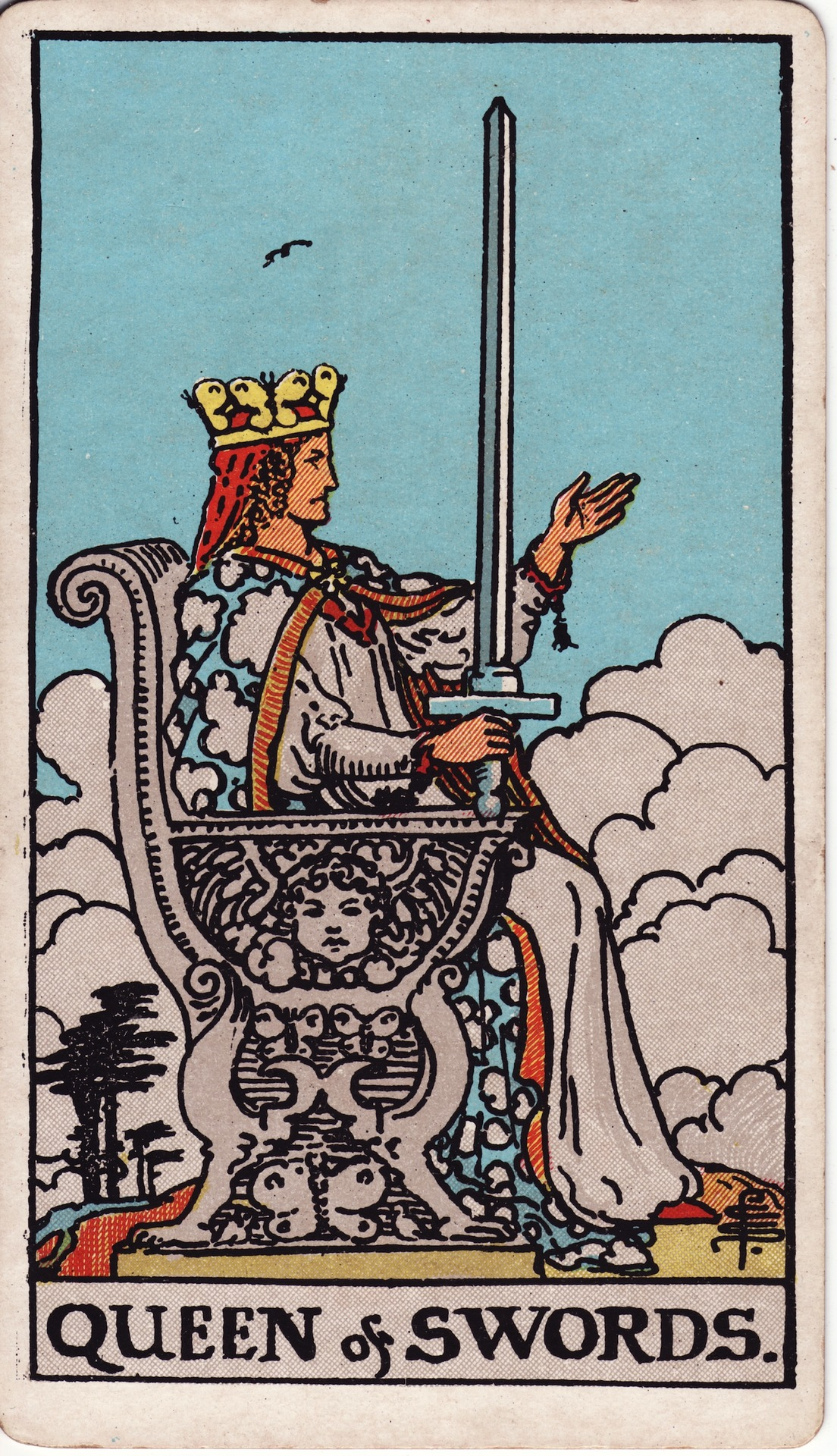
Queen of Swords

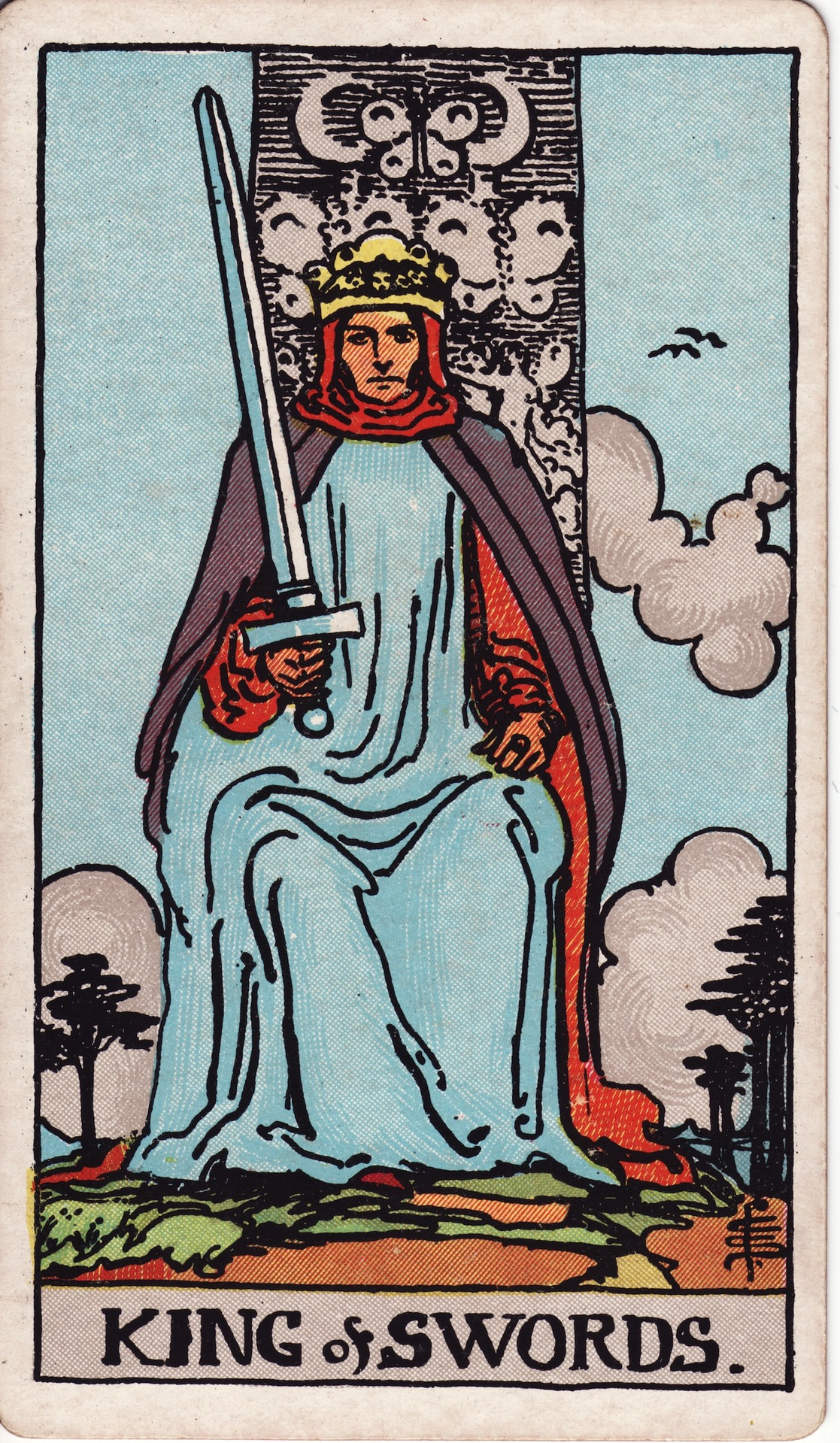
King of Swords

== See also ==
- Swords - suit of Latin (Italian/Spanish) playing cards
