= Queen of Swords =

Minor Arcana tarot card

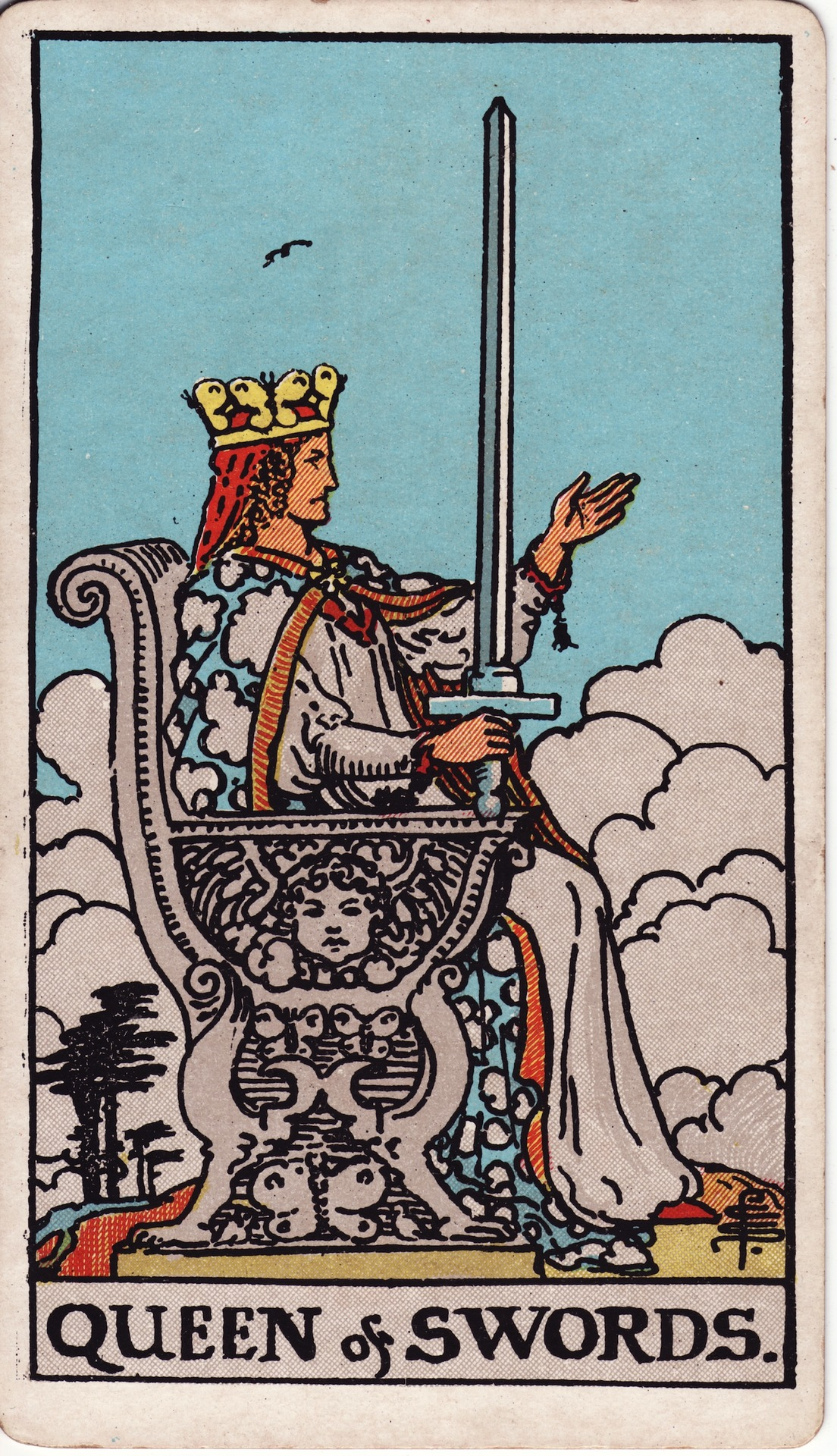
Queen of Swords from the Rider–Waite tarot deck

The Queen of Swords is a card in the suit of swords, part of the Minor Arcana set of the tarot.

Tarot cards are used throughout much of Europe to play tarot card games. In English-speaking countries, where the games are largely unknown, tarot cards came to be utilized primarily for divinatory purposes.

== Interpretations ==
- The Queen of Swords traditionally corresponds to the roles of widow, crone, and divorcée. She is seen to have very high standards and can be highly critical of herself and others.
- "For a woman in our culture," states American Tarot reader and artist Tiffany Lee Brown, "this could look like a pretty enviable show of power." In this interpretation, the Queen of Swords card represents what women have historically lacked for countless generations: "the boundaries, the physical ability, the power to completely lay out the terms under which we will parlay... to say how words are spoken in front of us, who does what to or toward our person." The contemporary Queen of Swords may represent positive feminist traits such as self-sufficiency, independence, and intelligence.
- The position of the Queen of Swords in a reading is relevant to the card's interpretation. If the card appears in a future position, the queen could be "showing you the way," wrote Mary K. Greer, author of "21 Ways to Read a Tarot Card" (Llewellyn, 2008) and other Tarot-related books. Greer encourages divinatory tarot practitioners to avoid fixating on gender roles matching biological sex; a queen might represent the querent's father, for example.

== Smith–Rider–Waite symbolism ==
This section pertains to the symbolism evident in the Queen of Swords card as depicted in the Smith–Rider–Waite tarot deck, also known as the RWS or Smith–Waite deck, which was illustrated by Pamela Colman Smith.

- The Queen of Swords is extending her hand, perhaps to reach for another; but she also holds her sword firmly before her, perhaps as a warning, a self-protection or a test for another. The Pictorial Key to the Tarot, or PKT notes that she is familiar with sorrow.
- Her crown is made up of butterflies, which are symbolic of the element of air and the realm of the mind. This depiction can be seen as showing the freedom of her thought and her active intellect.
- Note the difference between the pristine white clouds, and the darker ones showing up on the right bottom corner. The darker clouds may suggest her sorrows, as the PKT has specified. The lighter clouds highlight the unusual clarity of her mind and thoughts. This illustration may be compared with other sword court cards, where illustrator Pamela Colman Smith has painted mostly tarnished-looking clouds.
- Some interpret the queen's hand held out in front as a signifier of putting thoughts into action. All the sword cards represent the mind and the element of air all the skyscapes will indicate the "emotion" of the card. The clouds low on the horizon in this card can be read as suggesting new ideas or a new enterprise.
