= Two of Swords =

Minor Arcana tarot card

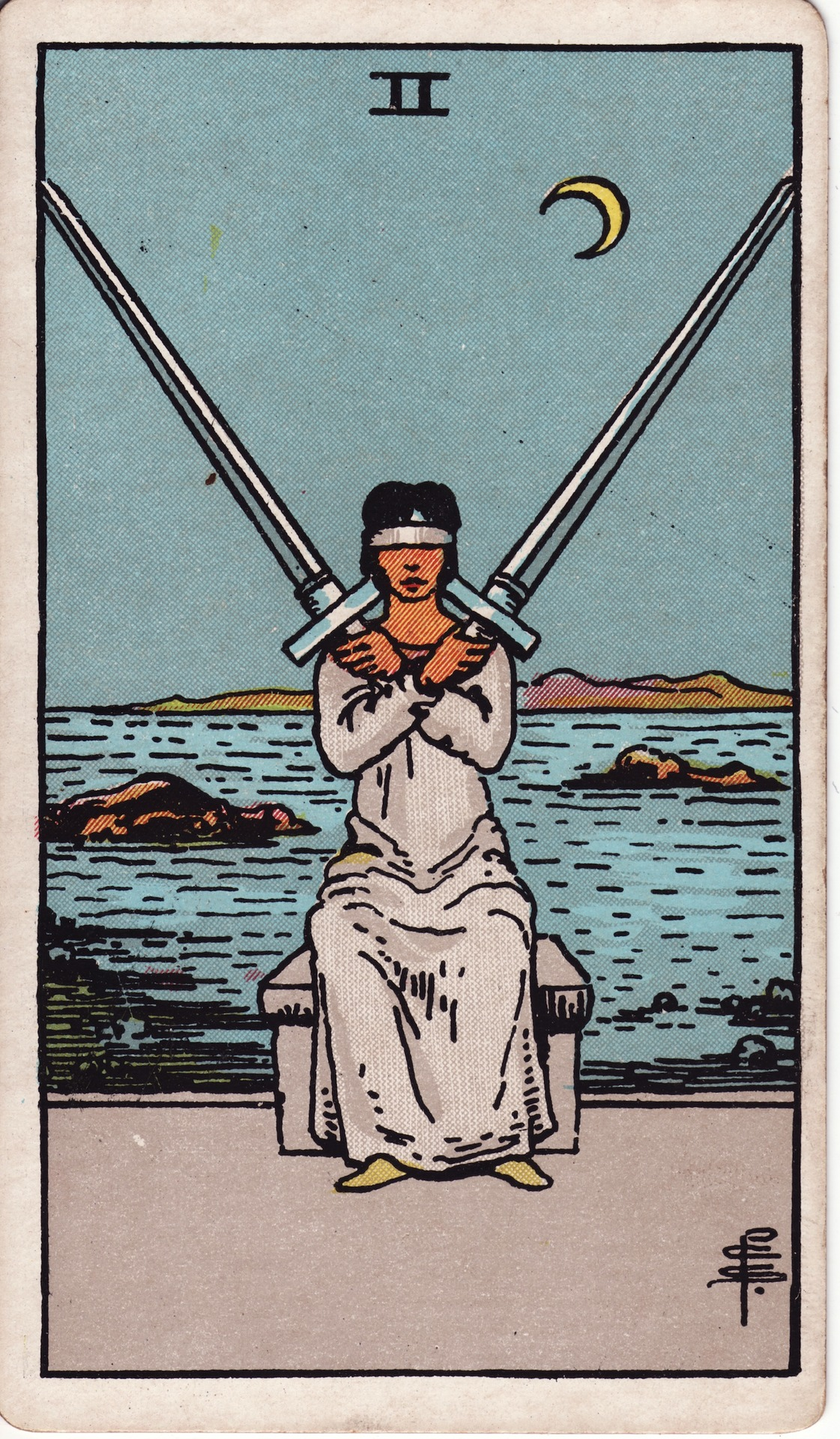
Two of Swords from the Rider–Waite tarot deck

The Two of Swords is a Minor Arcana tarot card. Tarot cards are used throughout much of Europe to play tarot card games. In English-speaking countries, where the games are largely unknown, tarot cards came to be utilized primarily for divinatory purposes.

== Divination usage ==
A female figure sits blindfolded, as she calmly balances two swords across her shoulders. Behind her is a large body of water and above her is the moon.

The woman's seated position, in combination with the crescent moon, recalls the High Priestess card, and we find a link as well in this card's representation of the characteristic strength of intuition. The woman's blindfold and the sea show a necessity to rely not on immediate stimuli but on deeper thoughts and feelings, that part of the unconscious mind that we call our higher self.

Her seated position, when conceptually paired with the balanced swords and the blindfold, may also recall the Justice card. Yet here the concept of justice is not one of retribution, but of making decisions that are balanced, moral and that we trust to be harmonious within and without ourselves.

Unlike the woman held captive on the eight of swords, this card depicts a woman in control. The scene and the discipline of her pose do more to suggest that she has placed the blindfold on herself, as is done in many cultures, ritualistically, to encourage reliance on the other senses (for example the use of blindfolds in martial arts).

The woman is blind in her situation, but she is safe, not only unafraid, but centered. She wields powerful weapons, but they are not held in a position that is threatening to her or anyone else. The moon and the sea reinforce this sense of calm and equanimity.

This is a card of meditation, not of action. The crossed swords point to different possible directions, but for the moment the character is looking inward rather than outward and in the possession of an awesome power that protects her until she finds the direction to apply it.

== See also ==
- two swords (expression)
- Spanish playing cards
