= Ace of Swords =

Minor Arcana tarot card

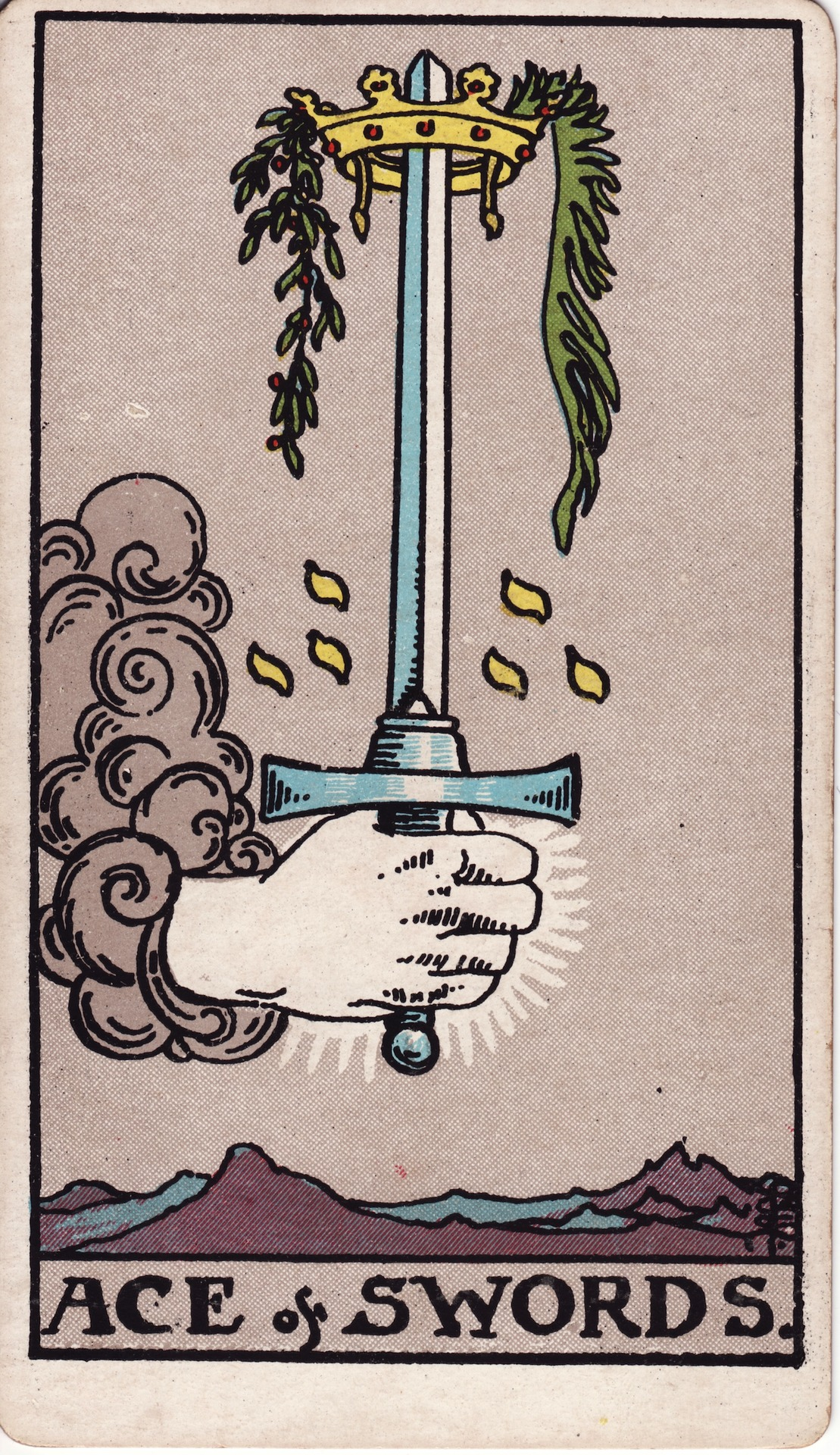
Ace of Swords from the Rider–Waite tarot deck

The Ace of Swords is a card used in Latin-suited playing cards (Italian, Spanish and tarot decks). It is the ace from the suit of swords.

Tarot cards are used throughout much of Europe to play tarot card games. In English-speaking countries, where the games are largely unknown, tarot cards came to be utilized primarily for divinatory purposes.

== Description ==
The card consists of a sword overtopped by a crown with which, depending on the side, an olive and a palm branch are present. These symbols represent mercy and severity.

"A hand comes out of a cloud, grasping a sword, the point of which is encircled by a crown."

A Golden Dawn description of the card from 1888, which preceded the Rider Waite version (pictured left) by 83 years: "A white Radiating Angelic Hand, issuing from clouds, and grasping the hilt of a sword, which supports a White Radiant Celestial Crown; from which depend, on the right, the olive branch of Peace; and on the left, the palm branch of suffering."

This description implies significant similarities between the Golden Dawn version and the Rider Waite version. Though the Rider Waite does follow the Golden Dawn tradition (as opposed to the Thoth tradition), the illustrations by Colman Smith are often vastly different.

== Divinatory usage ==
=== Rider-Waite Smith ===
Waite describes the meanings of this card as "triumph, the excessive degree in everything, conquest, triumph of force. It is a card of great force, in love as well as in hatred."

Other interpretations describe the Ace of Swords represents truth and intellect in its purest, most distilled form. This is because of its position as the ace of the suit.

It's important to note in understanding this card that all of the swords cards numbered 2-10 clearly depict pain, confusion, anger, and deception. It's not completely free of its ties to the rest of the suit. The imagery of the crown on the tip of the sword is the most likely explanation for Waite's interpretation of "triumph."

In Pollack's interpretation of the imagery: The hand grips the sword tightly, representing the intensity that comes with clear perception.The mountains towards the bottom of the card represent the "objective facts of existence", and the cloud that the hand emerges from represents "a deeper level of spiritual values" that balances the cold, intellectual quality of the card with emotion.

==== Reversed meanings ====
Waite: "The same [as above], but the results are disastrous; another account says conception, childbirth, augmentation, multiplicity." Pollack describes it similarly.

=== Golden Dawn ===
The Golden Dawn tradition names this card "The Root of the Powers of the Air." It is considered a very powerful card. Since it's an ace, representing the element of air, it has no assigned astrological ties to a planet or sign.

==== Reversed meanings ====
When reversed, the Ace of Swords becomes a "fearfully evil symbol."
