= Three of Swords =

Minor Arcana tarot card

Three of Swords ("tre di spade") from an Italian deck

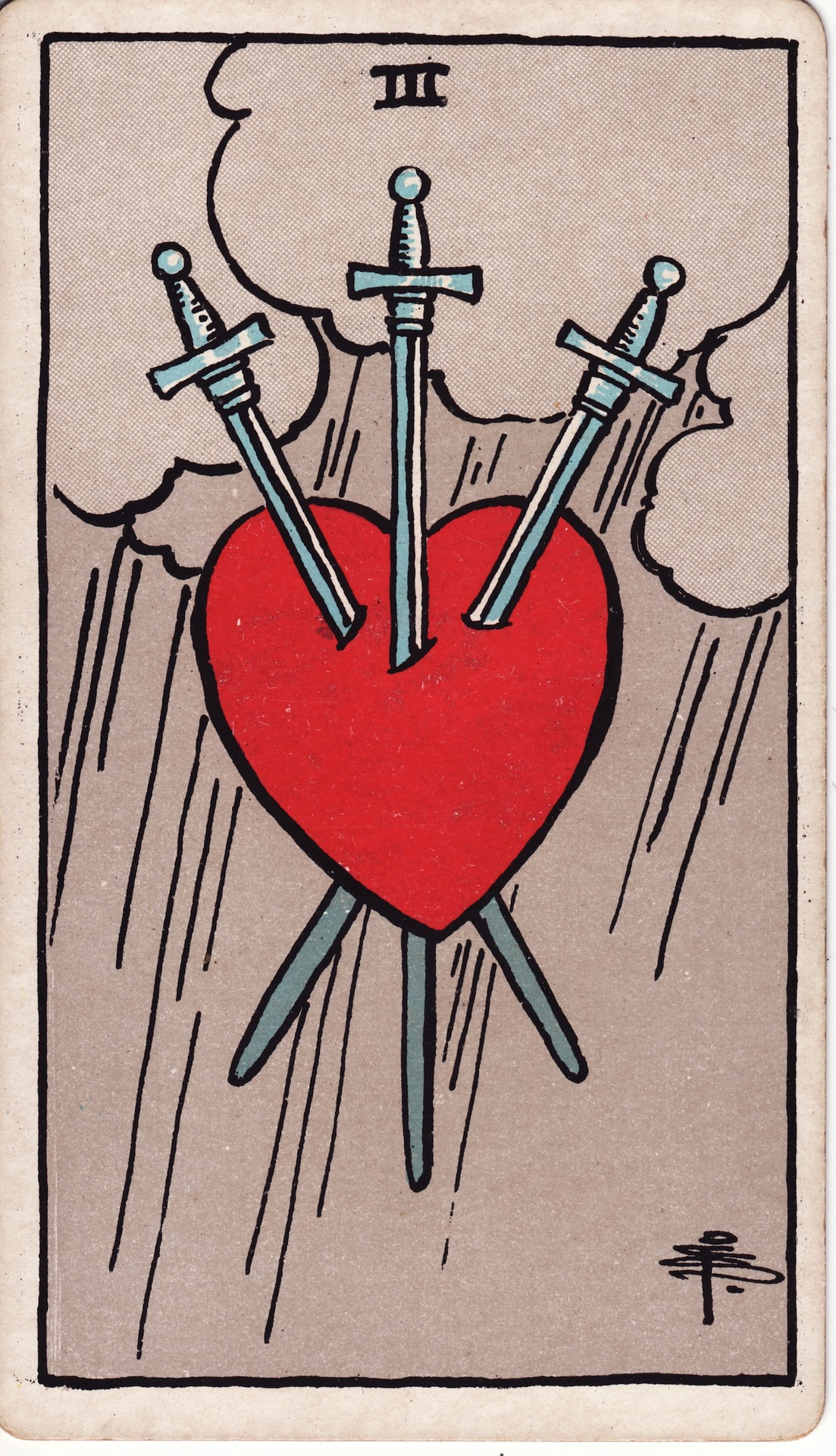
Three of Swords from the Rider–Waite tarot deck

The Three of Swords is the third card of the suit of swords. The suit is present in Italian, Spanish, and tarot decks.

Tarot cards are used throughout much of Europe to play tarot card games. In English-speaking countries, where the games are largely unknown, tarot cards came to be utilized primarily for divinatory purposes.

== Card reading ==
This card depicts a fundamentally sorrowful experience—tarot readers suggest this may be in the form of a lost relationship, an accidental death, or some other form of not just depression or malaise but deeply emotional sorrow. When the card appears "reversed" in a spread, this is not usually read as meaning the "opposite" of sorrow, but rather a sorrow that is somehow mitigated by its circumstances or that is not as bad as it could have been. It is among the most negative cards within the tarot deck.
