= Five of Swords =

Minor Arcana tarot card

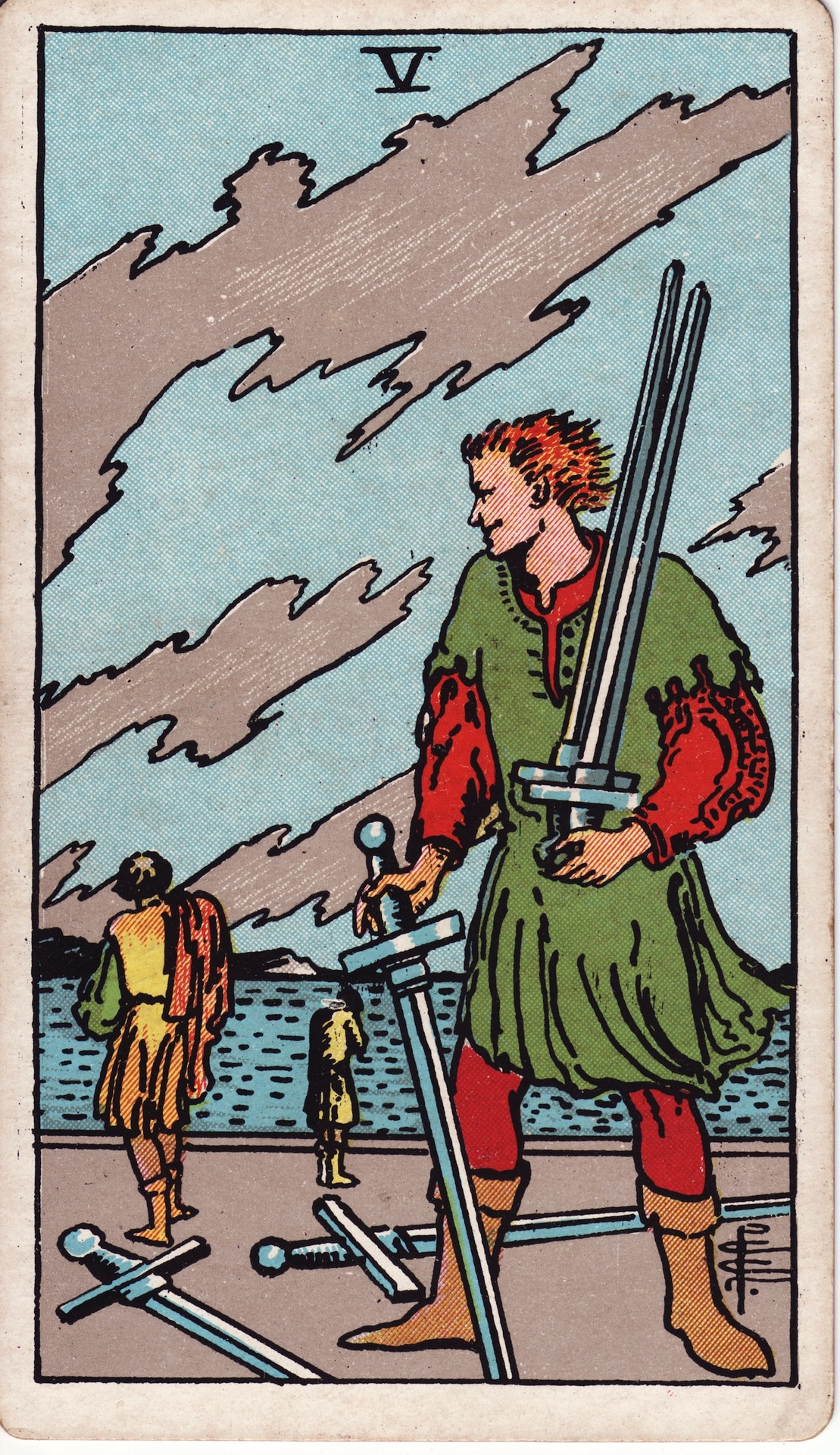
Five of Swords from the Rider–Waite tarot deck

The Five of Swords is a Minor Arcana tarot card. It is associated with the element of Air and is the fifth card in the Suit of Swords. The card deals with themes of conflict, defeat, and the consequences of winning at any cost.

Tarot cards are used throughout much of Europe to play tarot card games. In English-speaking countries, where the games are largely unknown, tarot cards came to be utilized primarily for divinatory purposes.

== Symbolism ==
In the Rider–Waite depiction, a man stands in the foreground holding three swords, looking over his shoulder with an ambiguous expression that may be interpreted as either smugness or uncertainty. Two additional swords lie on the ground before him. In the background, two defeated figures walk away under a turbulent, stormy sky. The jagged clouds suggest that the conflict has left the atmosphere charged with lingering tension.

The scene raises questions about the nature of victory — the central figure has won the swords but stands alone, and the departing figures suggest that his triumph came at the cost of relationships. The three swords he carries may represent gains won through aggression or dishonesty, while the two on the ground represent what was lost or abandoned by the defeated parties. The overall composition suggests a Pyrrhic victory — a win that is ultimately more costly than losing would have been.

== Interpretation ==
=== Upright ===
The Five of Swords represents conflict, tension, hostile competition, and the aftermath of disagreements where someone has prioritized winning over maintaining harmony. It frequently appears when a situation has become adversarial and when the methods used to achieve victory are questionable or destructive. The card serves as a warning that aggressive approaches to conflict will leave lasting damage to relationships and reputation.

In career readings, the Five of Swords can indicate office politics, workplace bullying, unfair competition, or situations where someone advances at the expense of colleagues. In love readings, it may point to arguments, power struggles, or a relationship dynamic where one partner consistently dominates the other.

The card also carries a self-reflective message: the querent is invited to examine whether they are the victor or the defeated party in the situation, and whether the battle being fought is truly worth its cost.

=== Reversed ===
In its reversed position, the Five of Swords can indicate reconciliation after a period of conflict, the desire to make amends, or a willingness to move past old grievances. It may suggest that the querent is ready to lay down their weapons and seek peaceful resolution. However, the reversed position can also indicate lingering resentment, the inability to forgive past wrongs, or grudges that continue to poison relationships long after the original conflict has ended.

In some interpretations, the reversed Five of Swords represents the regret that follows a hollow victory — the realization that winning the argument or the battle was not worth what was lost in the process.
