= Six of Swords =

Minor Arcana tarot card

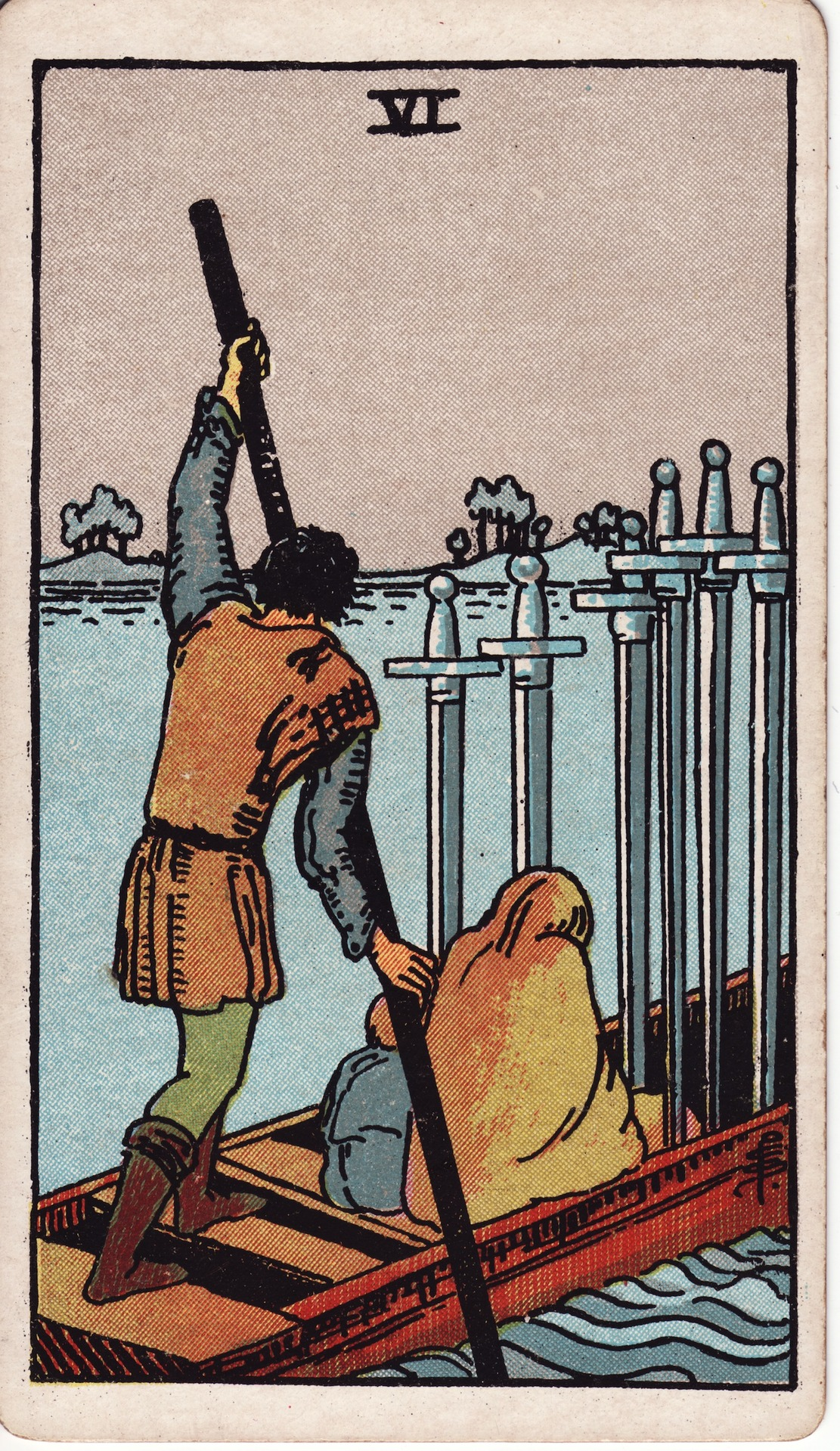
Six of Swords from the Rider–Waite tarot deck

The Six of Swords is a card used in Latin-suited playing cards which include tarot decks. It is part of what tarot card readers call the "Minor Arcana".

Tarot cards are used throughout much of Europe to play tarot card games. In English-speaking countries, where the games are largely unknown, tarot cards came to be utilized primarily for divinatory purposes.

== Symbolism ==
The card is sometimes seen as depicting the Slough of Despond from The Pilgrim's Progress. Upright it can mean: gradual change, movement, or travel away from difficulty or imminent danger; the solution of current problems; long journeys and passage from pain; or obstacles which are overcome. It may also be a suggestion of interpenetrating worlds, and changing channels from one set of perceptions to another.
