= Ten of Swords =

Minor Arcana tarot card

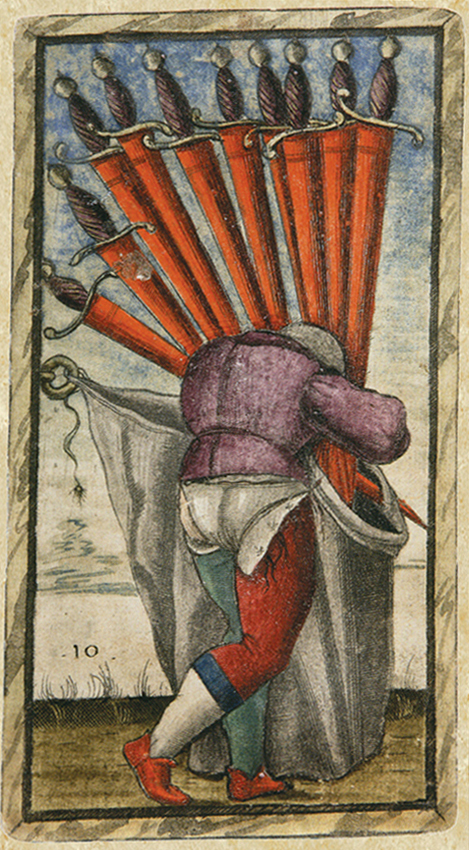
The Ten of Swords in the Sola-Busca tarot deck

The Ten of Swords is a Minor Arcana tarot card.

Tarot cards are used throughout much of Europe to play tarot card games. In English-speaking countries, where the games are largely unknown, tarot cards came to be utilized primarily for divinatory purposes.The Ten of Swords, can signify the end of a difficult cycle, despair, a major disaster, crisis, betrayal, or even hope and new beginnings after a disaster. It depicts a man, on some decks lying on the ground or on others, standing in a slumped position, stabbed by ten swords that are in his back.

== In popular culture ==
There was a Bob Dylan bootleg compilation called Ten of Swords released on ten 12-inch vinyl records, which consisted of various unreleased material of the artist.

A track off the Arsis album Starve for the Devil is entitled "The Ten of Swords".

The final episode of AMC's television series Halt and Catch Fire is titled "Ten of Swords".

The 2021 release All Things from Antagonist A.D. features a track titled "Ten of Swords". The track discusses feelings of hopelessness, despair, and self-loathing.
