= Four of Swords =

Minor Arcana tarot card

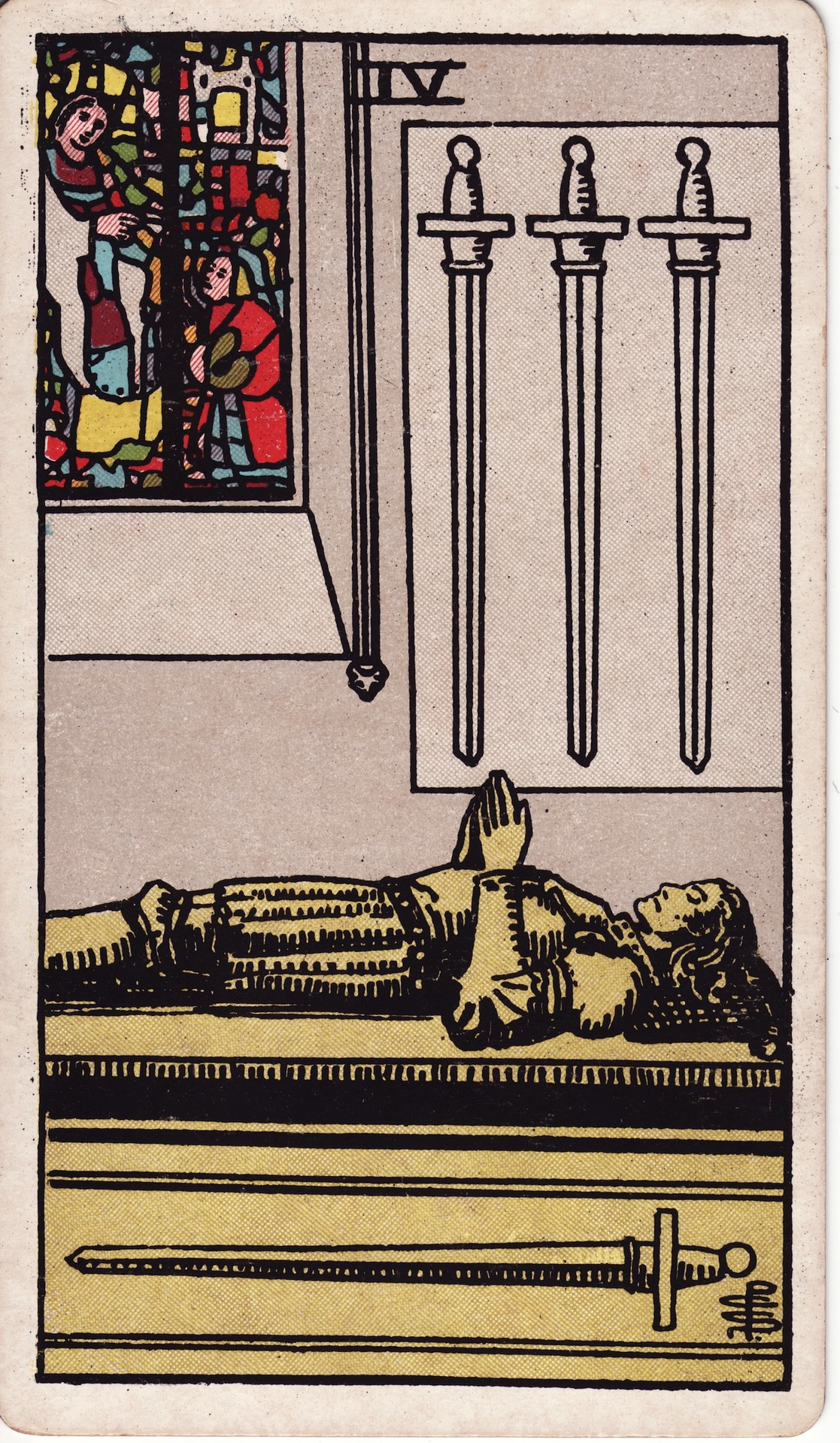
Four of Swords from the Rider–Waite tarot deck

The Four of Swords is a Minor Arcana tarot card.

Tarot cards are used throughout much of Europe to play tarot card games. In English-speaking countries, where the games are largely unknown, tarot cards came to be utilized primarily for divinatory purposes.

== Description ==
"The effigy of a knight in the attitude of prayer, at full length upon his tomb." - The Pictorial Key to the Tarot, by A.E. Waite

== Divination usage ==
Vigilance, retreat, solitude, hermit's repose, exile, tomb and coffin. The single sword at the knight's side indicates a singularity of purpose and a great focus in life. Reversed: wise administration, circumspection, economy, avarice, precaution, testament. When ascending this card can mean going into a cocoon like a butterfly, opening up your third eye. Getting in touch with your purpose in life.

It is mostly associated with a peaceful, still place. It reflects withdrawal, getting away and shifting the focus inwardly so that recovery and healing can take place.
