= Page of Swords =

Minor Arcana tarot card

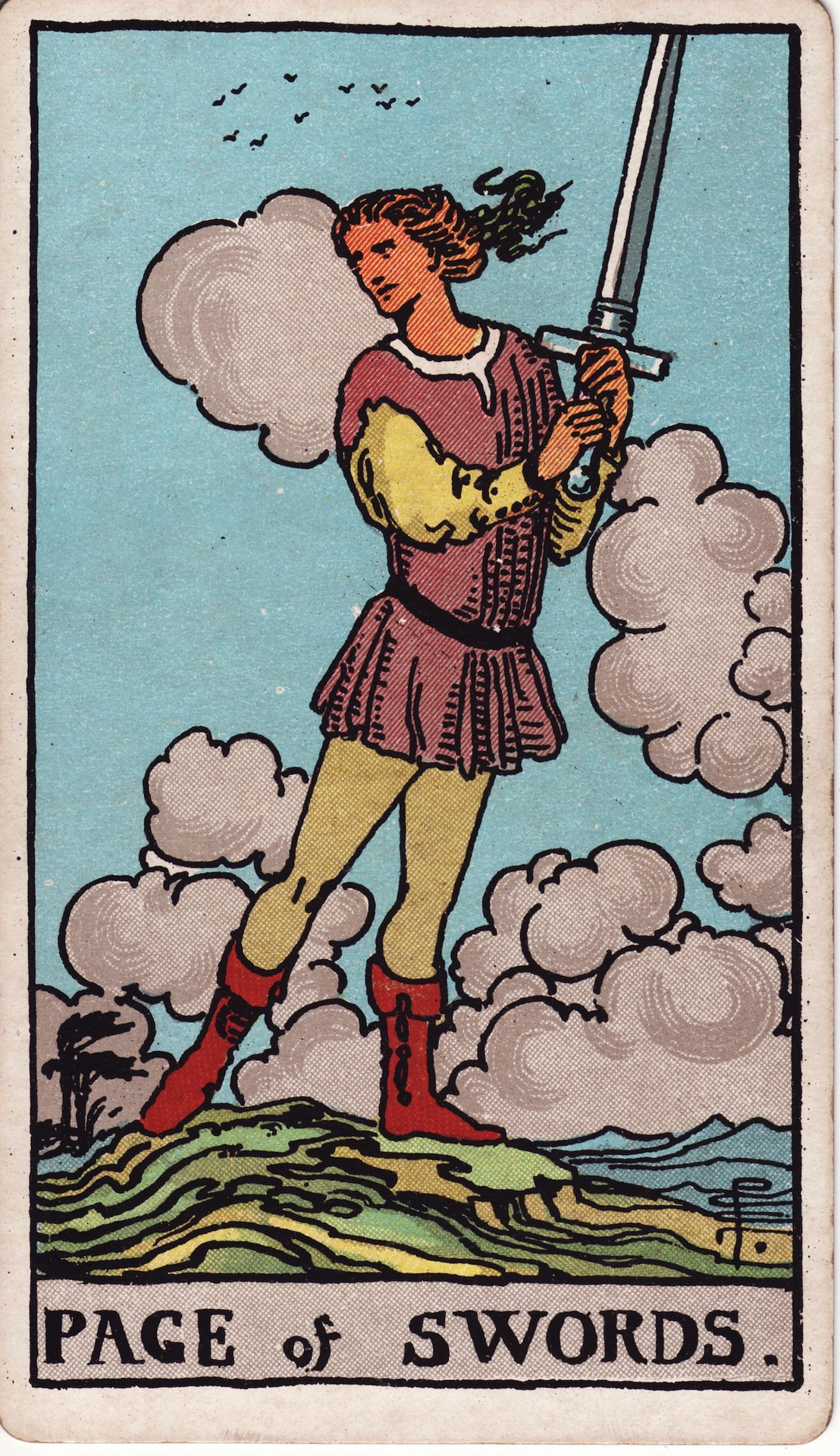
Page of Swords from the Rider–Waite tarot deck

The Page of Swords (or jack or knave of swords) is a card used in Latin-suited playing cards which include tarot decks. It is part of what tarot card readers call the "Minor Arcana".

Tarot cards are used throughout much of Europe to play tarot card games. In English-speaking countries, where the games are largely unknown, tarot cards came to be utilized primarily for divinatory purposes.

== Symbolism ==
The page of swords card shows a young man holding his sword up to the sky. His body and sword move in the same direction while he turns his head to the opposite side, as a sign of his curiosity for the things that are around him and not only for the given path. Although equipped with a sword, he otherwise wears only a light robe that allows him to move and advance freely, rather than heavy armor that would only hinder him on his way. A strong breeze blows through the man's hair and the looming clouds in the background convey an energetic dynamic inherent in this card.

Alternative interpretations include a mischievous character, malicious intent, ruined reputation, gossip or chatterbox, idle or stirring the pot of drama and rumors.
