= King of Swords =

Minor Arcana tarot card

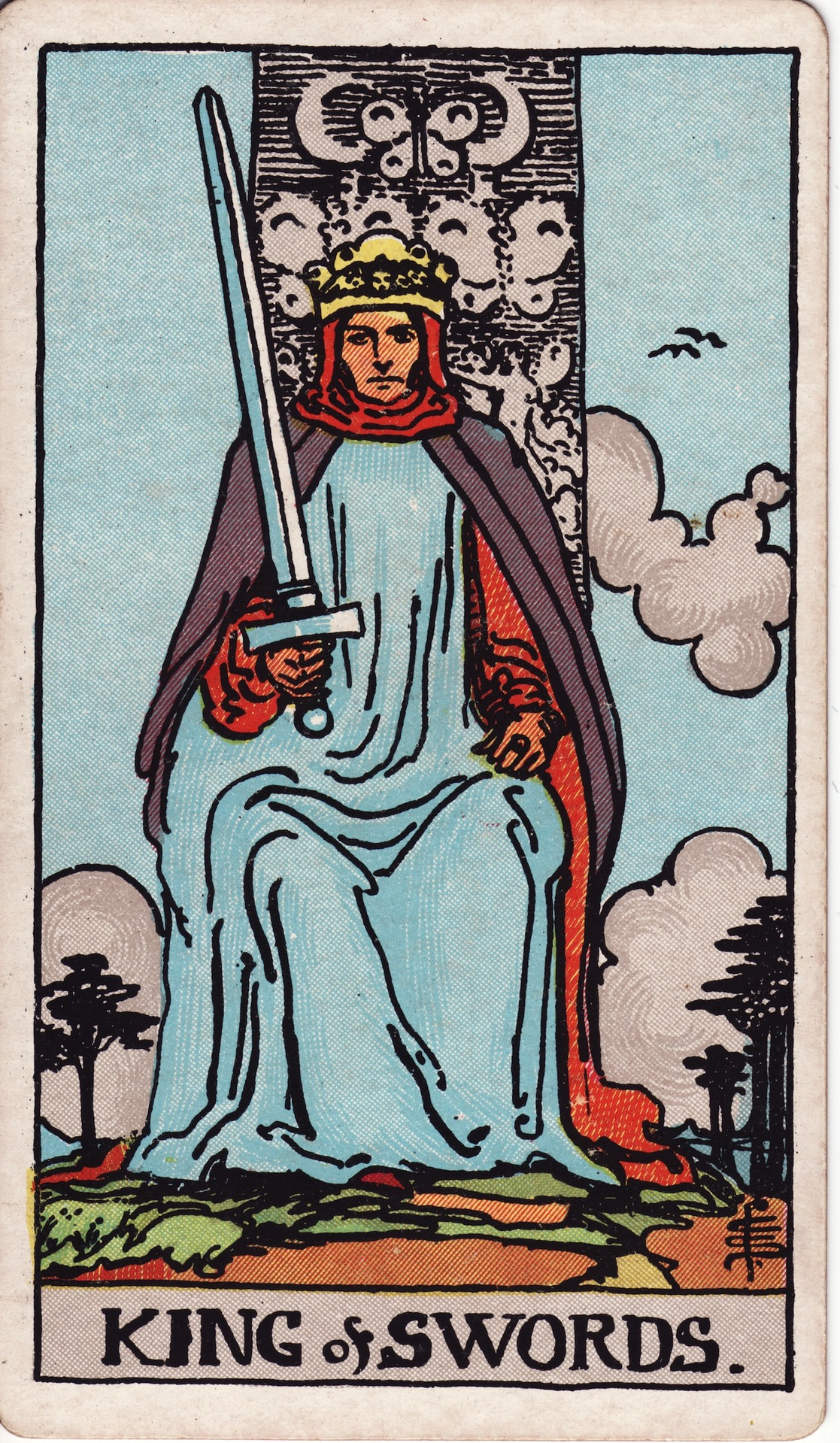
King of Swords from the Rider–Waite tarot deck

The King of Swords is a card used in Latin-suited playing cards which include tarot decks. It is part of what tarot card readers call the "Minor Arcana".

Tarot cards are used throughout much of Europe to play tarot card games. In English-speaking countries, where the games are largely unknown, tarot cards came to be utilized primarily for divinatory purposes.

== Appearance ==
The King of Swords card from the Minor Arcana depicts a man sitting in a throne with a sword in his right hand. He stares directly forward. His posture and expression indicate authority and an unwavering mind. His robe is blue, symbolizing spiritual maturity.

== Divination ==
=== Upright ===
The King of Swords represents leadership, intellect, rationality, and logic. It represents someone who is stubborn and rigid in their thinking. In some cases, it may reflect societal views of masculinity. If someone is thinking too emotionally about a scenario, it may suggest looking at things from a logical or critical point of view. If someone is thinking too logically about a scenario, it may suggest looking at things with a more open-hearted point of view. The King of Swords suggests balance between extreme rationality and extreme fervor.

=== Reversed ===
Since the King of Swords represents leadership, when reversed, it can represent misuse of power or irrationality. It can warn of someone using their power to harm rather than lead. It represents a figure who is cruel, ruthless, and stubborn.
