= Seven of Swords =

Minor Arcana tarot card

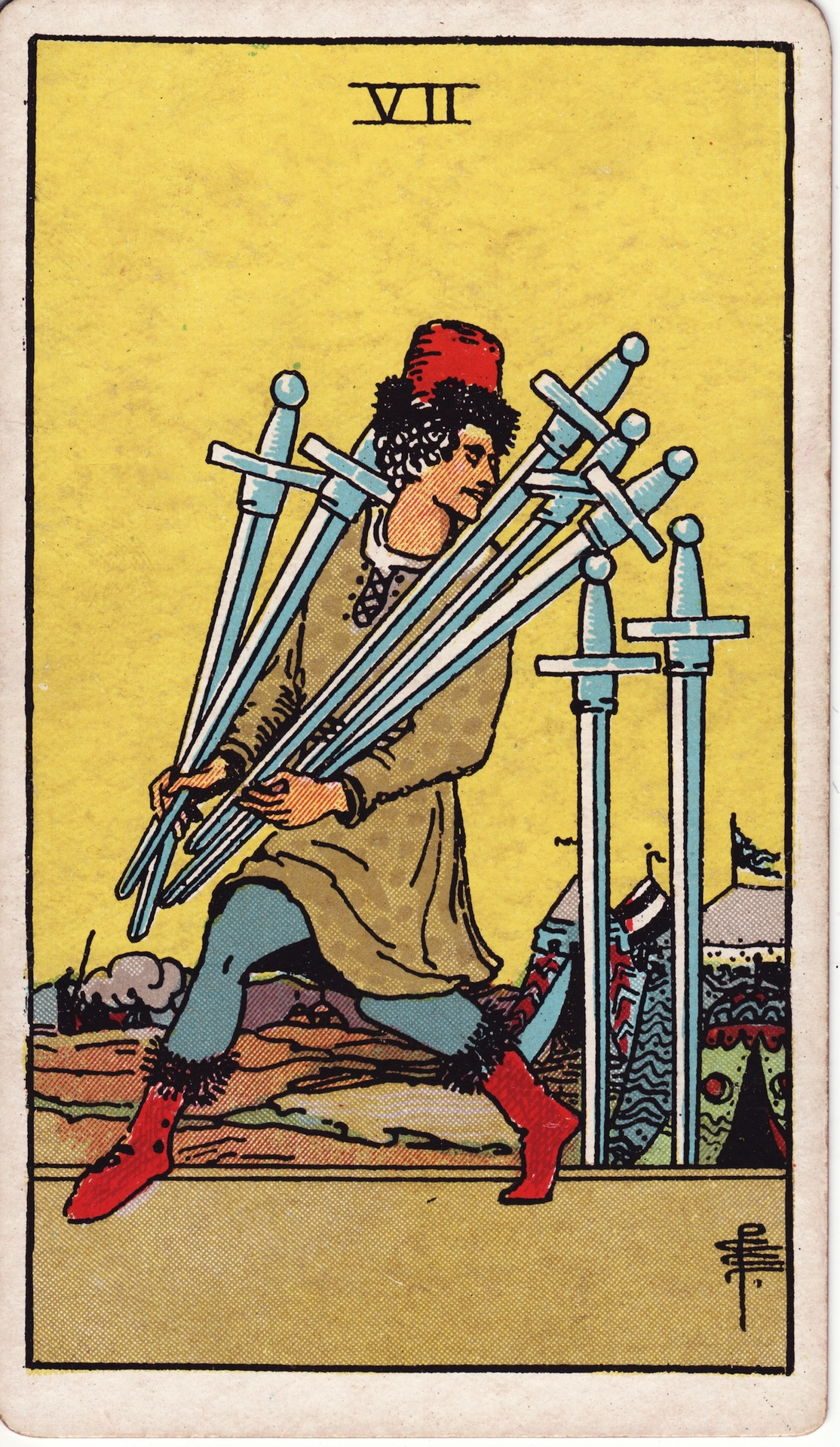
Seven of Swords from the Rider–Waite tarot deck

The Seven of Swords is a Minor Arcana tarot card. It can symbolize theft.

Tarot cards are used throughout much of Europe to play tarot card games. In English-speaking countries, where the games are largely unknown, tarot cards came to be utilized primarily for divinatory purposes.
