= Knight of Swords =

Minor Arcana tarot card

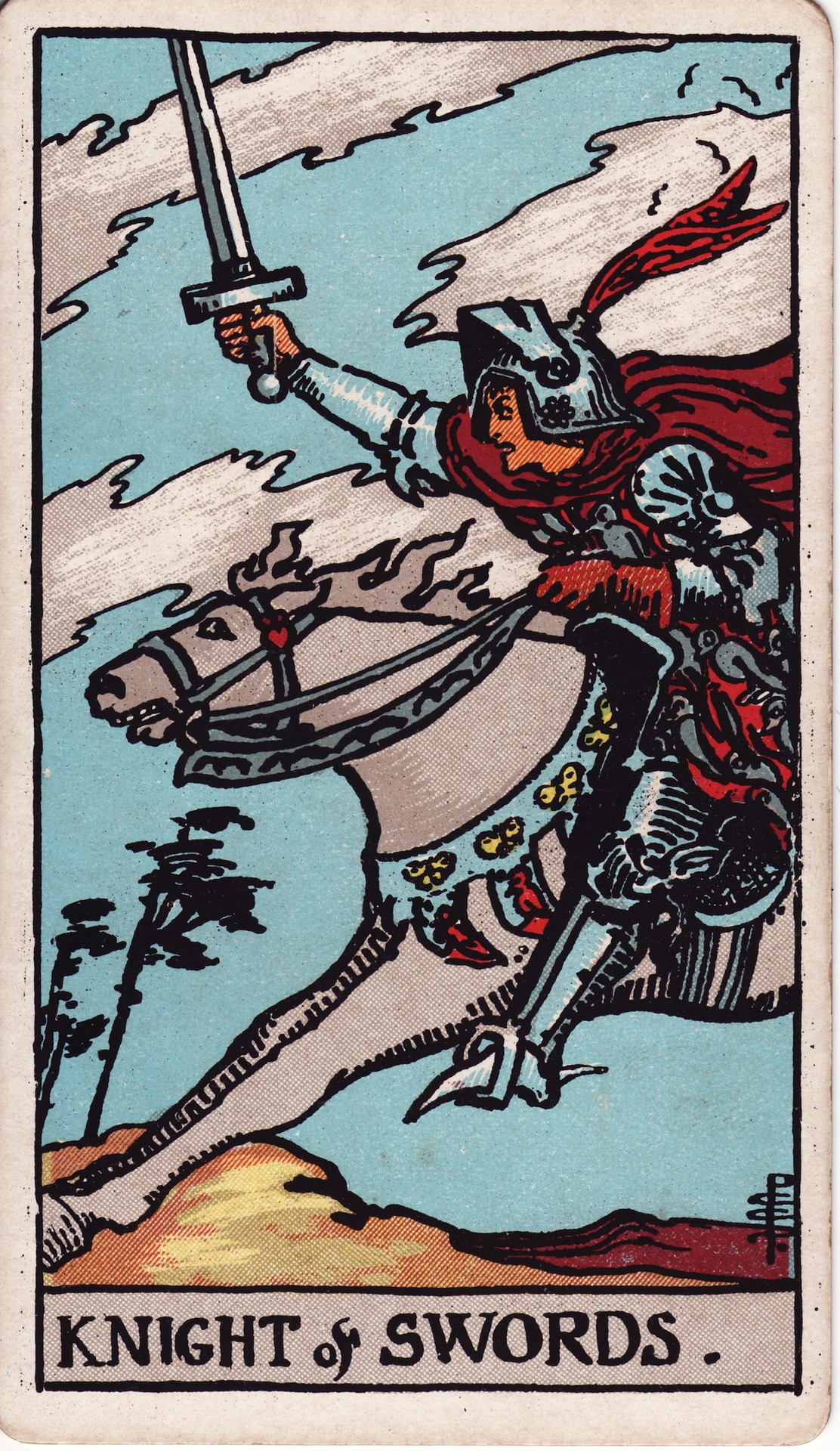
Knight of Swords from the Rider–Waite tarot deck

The Knight of Swords is a card used in Latin-suited playing cards which include tarot decks. It is part of what tarot card readers call the "Minor Arcana".

Tarot cards are used throughout much of Europe to play tarot card games. In English-speaking countries, where the games are largely unknown, tarot cards came to be utilized primarily for divinatory purposes.

== Symbolism ==
According to Waite, he is described as riding in full course, as if scattering his enemies. This fits well, as Waite associates it, among other things, with war and wrath.

Alternative interpretations include one's quest for knowledge and information that may not always be factual, changing of thoughts or decisions, rushing into relationships, commitments or projects, entering ones life and turning it up-side-down before leaving, chaotic influence or the developing of the mind with new ideas and information through a course of study or changing careers overnight.

== Interpretation ==
The knight of Swords is often taken to represent a confident and articulate young man, who may act impulsively. The problem is that this knight, though visionary, is unrealistic. He fights bravely, but foolishly. In some illustrations, he is shown to have forgotten his armor or his helmet. A 'rush to war' is a possibility with this warrior. When played "reversed", the knight of swords could represent a clever liar, secrets, or a sly and deceitful confidence trickster. A reversed knight of swords is also a warning that an intended path would be a terrible mistake, or more precisely, that reconsidering your actions would be a wise decision.
