= Eight of Swords =

Minor Arcana tarot card

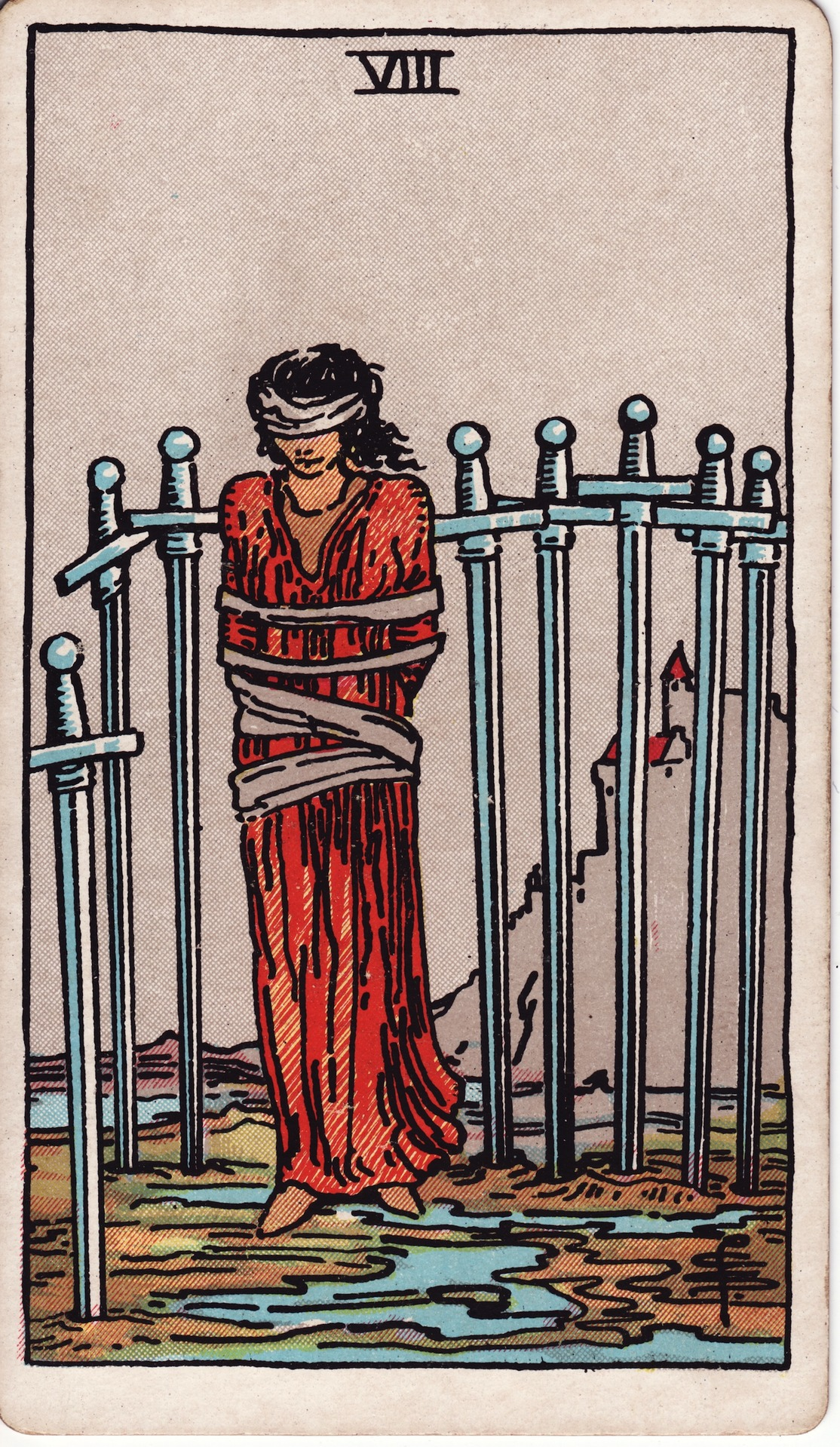
Eight of Swords from the Rider–Waite tarot deck

The Eight of Swords is a Minor Arcana tarot card.

Tarot cards are used throughout much of Europe to play tarot card games. In English-speaking countries, where the games are largely unknown, tarot cards came to be utilized primarily for divinatory purposes.

== Symbolism ==
The Eight of Swords is associated with feeling trapped, being restrained and being hopeless. It can also mean that one is blinded by one's own thoughts, the surrounding swords can be used to help free one but one's own judgment is keeping one trapped.
