= Echo Park =

Neighborhood of Los Angeles, California, US

- Neighborhood
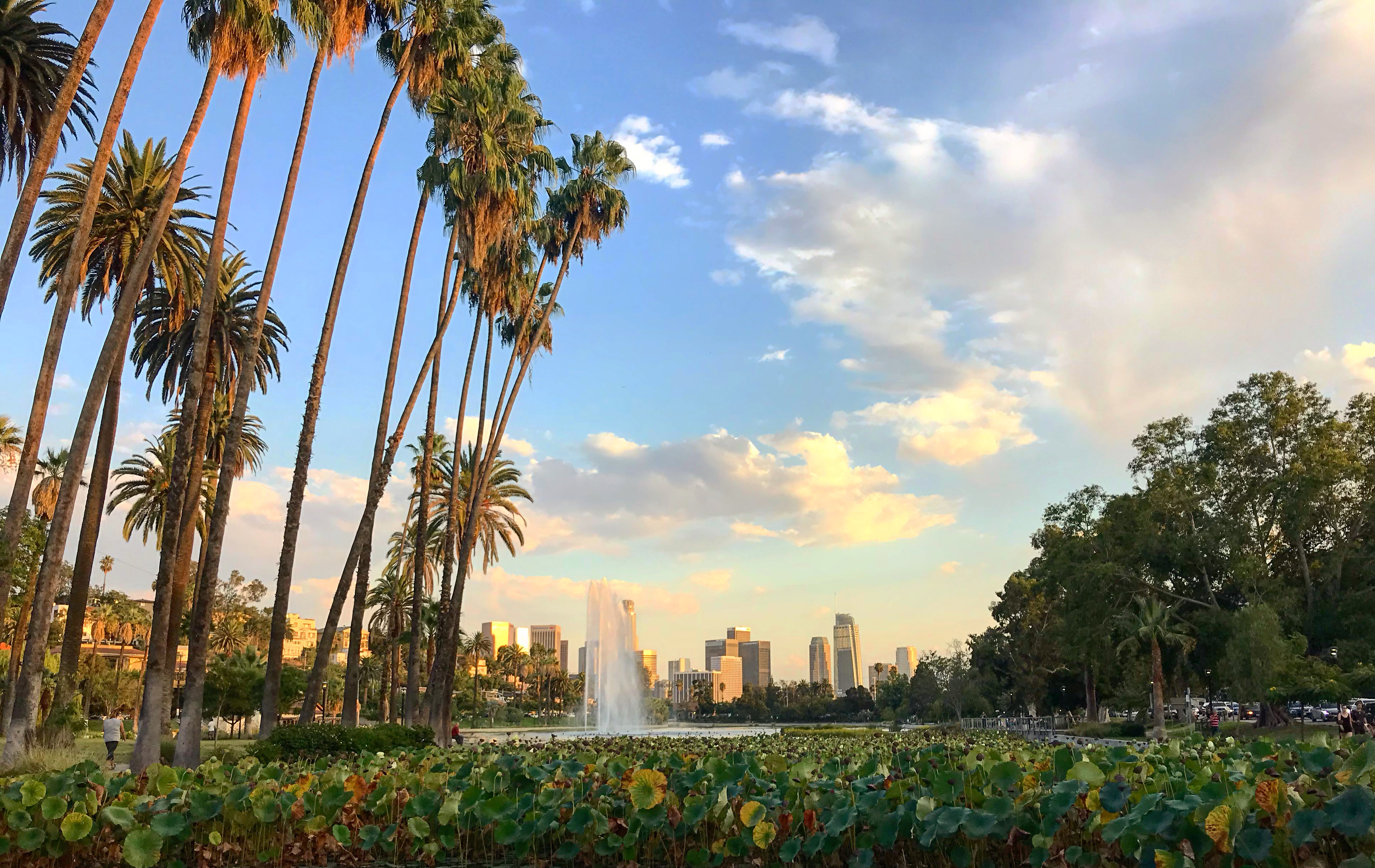
- Echo Park Lake, with the Downtown Los Angeles skyline in the background

- Location within Central Los Angeles Location within the Los Angeles metropolitan area Location within California Location within the United States
- Coordinates: 34.0792°N 118.258°W
- Country: United States
- State: California
- County: Los Angeles
- City: Los Angeles
- Elevation: 394 ft (120 m)
- Time zone: UTC−8 (PST)
  - Summer (DST): UTC−7 (PDT)
- ZIP Code: 90026
- Area codes: 213, 323

Echo Park is a neighborhood in the central region of Los Angeles, California, United States. Located to the northwest of Downtown, it borders with Silver Lake to the west and Chinatown to the east. The culturally diverse neighborhood has become known for its trendy local businesses, as well as its popularity with artists, musicians and creative types. The neighborhood is centered on the eponymous Echo Park Lake.

== History ==
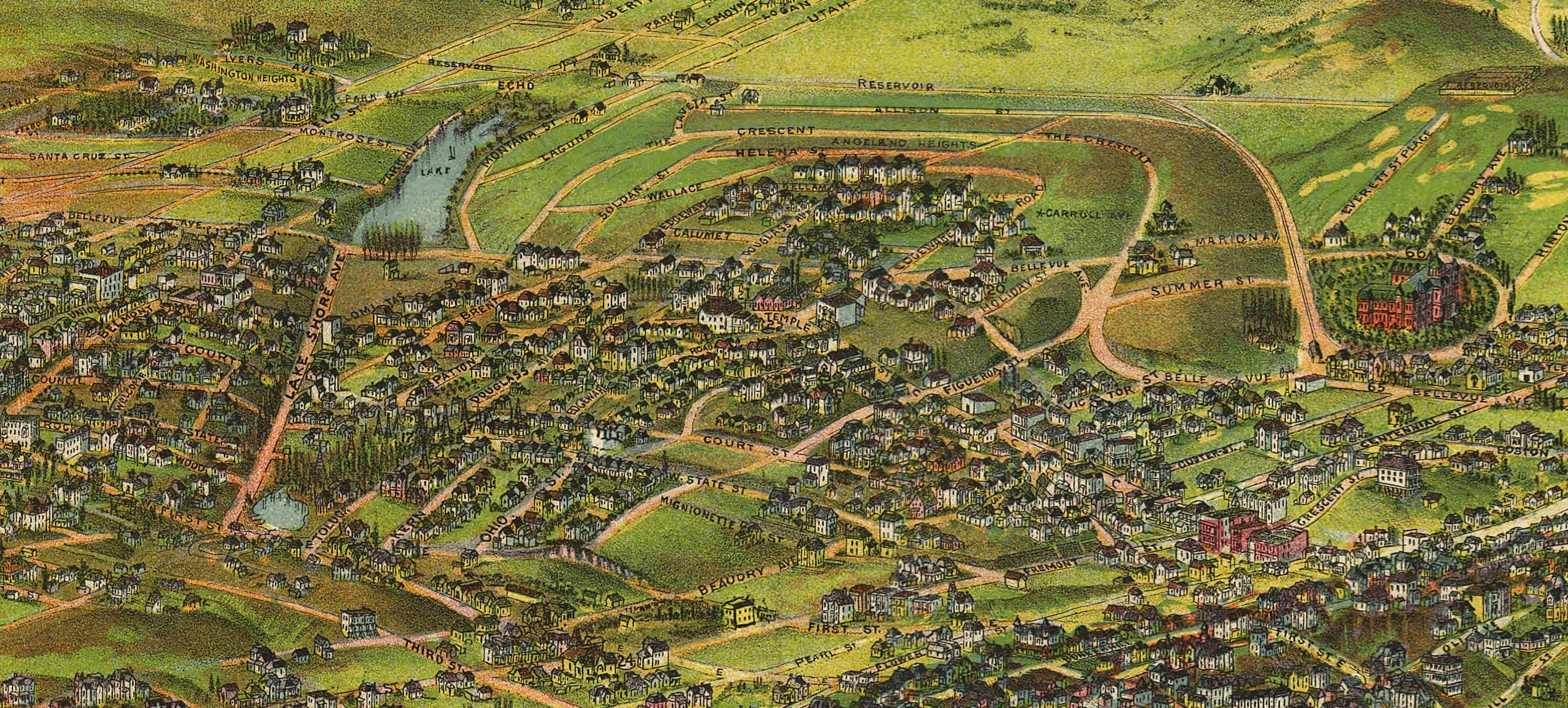
The area now known as Echo Park in 1894. Echo Park Lake is at the top left. Glendale Boulevard is marked as Lake Shore Avenue. The Temple–Beaudry district is at the right center.

=== Edendale ===
Established in 1892, and long before Hollywood became synonymous with the commercial film industry of the United States, the area of Echo Park known as Edendale was the center of filmmaking on the West Coast.

By the 1910s, several film studios were operating on Allesandro Avenue (now Glendale Boulevard) along the Echo Park-Silverlake border, including the Selig Polyscope Company, Mack Sennett's Keystone Studios, the Pathe West Coast Film Studio, and others.

Silent film stars who worked in the Edendale studios included Fatty Arbuckle, Harold Lloyd, Mabel Normand and Gloria Swanson. Charlie Chaplin's first film was made at Keystone Studios, as well as the very first feature-length comedy, which starred Chaplin and Normand.

The first pie-in-the-face scene was filmed at what later became the Mack Sennett Studios on Glendale Boulevard near Effie Street. The complex, which is now part of a storage facility, dates back to 1909 and includes one of the area's first permanent sound stages, the factories where movies are made. The former studio, 1712 Glendale Boulevard, is City of Los Angeles Historic-Cultural Monument No. 256.

=== Echo Park Lake ===
Echo Park Lake was established in 1868, as a drinking water reservoir, filled with water from a ditch that connects to the Los Angeles River in Los Feliz to the reservoir. In 1891, the four owners of the surrounding area gave up 33 acres (13 ha) of land around the reservoir to the city so that it could be used as a park. The city began work landscaping the park in October 1892. City parks superintendent Joseph Henry Tomlinson chose the name because of echoes he heard during the construction of Echo Park Lake in 1892. The park and accompanying boathouse were completed in 1895. By the late 1910s, motion picture companies on Allesandro Street, now Glendale Boulevard, had been using the park as a filming location.

Echo Park Lake was identified as an impaired body of water in 2006, and the city allocated $64.7 million to fund its cleanup and revitalization. In the summer of 2011, the lake was closed off and drained when the rehabilitation project began. The lake reopened on June 5, 2013, after a $45 million renovation.

Starting in November 2019, a growing population of homeless people began moving into the lake grounds. The encampment included nearly 200 homeless tents, and four homeless individuals died at the park in 2020. On March 25, 2021, the park was closed for renovations and cleared of the homeless encampments. Closure notices were posted throughout the park days before the sweep. During the sweep over 200 protesters clashed with LAPD, who arrested 179 protesters. The encampment and ensuing incident became a major flashpoint in LA's homelessness crisis.

Of the 183 homeless individuals living at Echo Park Lake, only 17 had successfully transitioned into permanent housing as of March 2022. In February 2023, councilmember Hugo Soto-Martinez announced plans to remove the fence that encircles the lake. The plans became divisive within the community, many of whom have advocated for the fence to remain, amid the ongoing homelessness crisis.

The fence surrounding the lake was removed May 30, 2023 by the city.

=== Transportation ===
==== Glendale Freeway termination ====
The Glendale Freeway (SR 2) was originally planned and constructed in 1959 to connect with the Hollywood Freeway (US-101) through the neighborhoods of Silver Lake and Echo Park, but terminates roughly 1.5 miles (2.4 km) northeast of its intended terminus at the Hollywood Freeway due to opposition from residents living in, and developers building on, a hill that is now a private gated community called Hathaway Estates.

In 1962, as a result of this local community opposition, the full build-out plan was rescinded and construction was terminated at the present SR-2 terminus near Glendale Boulevard and Duane Street. Since then, commuter traffic exiting and entering on to SR-2 has passed through the community, primarily along Glendale Boulevard and Alvarado Street, which has contributed to congestion. Since that plan was scrapped, the freeway has been somewhat isolated from the remainder of the Los Angeles freeway system. There have been proposals to turn the freeway stub into a sort of public park.

==== Pacific Electric Railway ====
The Pacific Electric Railway, better known as the Red Cars, used to run through Echo Park along the center of Glendale Boulevard. The citywide system of electric trolleys began with the dawn of the 20th century, ultimately spinning a web of rail that linked cities in Los Angeles, Orange, San Bernardino and Riverside counties. It was the largest and most advanced public transit system in the world at the time.

The Red Car system was sold to Metropolitan Coach Lines, whose executive, Jesse Haugh, had connections to a public transportation company funded by General Motors and other auto-related industries. The Red Cars faded out of service not long afterwards, with the Los Angeles-Glendale-Burbank Line that traveled through Echo Park officially ending service on June 19, 1955.

=== Gangs ===
Echo Park was once infamous as a hot spot for gang activity. This was true in the 1980s and 1990s, but in the early 2010s as the neighborhood began gentrifying, rents started to skyrocket, and a controversial gang injunction forced gang members to move outside their turf, instances of gang violence waned.

In 2013, a Los Angeles judge signed off on a permanent gang injunction aimed at six rival gangs in the Echo Park area, creating what authorities call a "safety zone" for the area. The injunction targeted the members of six gangs, namely Echo Park Locos, the Crazys, the Big Top Locos, the Diamond Street Locos, Frogtown Rifa, and Head Hunters. The perimeter for the safety zone was roughly bound by the Los Angeles River to the north, the 110 Freeway to the east, Beverly Boulevard to south and Glendale Boulevard to the west. It included Echo Park Lake and Dodger Stadium.

The injunction, a civil order, prohibits two or more listed gang members from associating in any way in public or in common areas like courtyards. It also allows for stricter penalties if any listed gang member is caught with drugs, alcohol, guns or vandalizing property.

== Geography ==
Echo Park has many rolling hills and valleys with a few flat areas like Echo Park Lake. Its main commercial corridors are Sunset and Glendale boulevards.

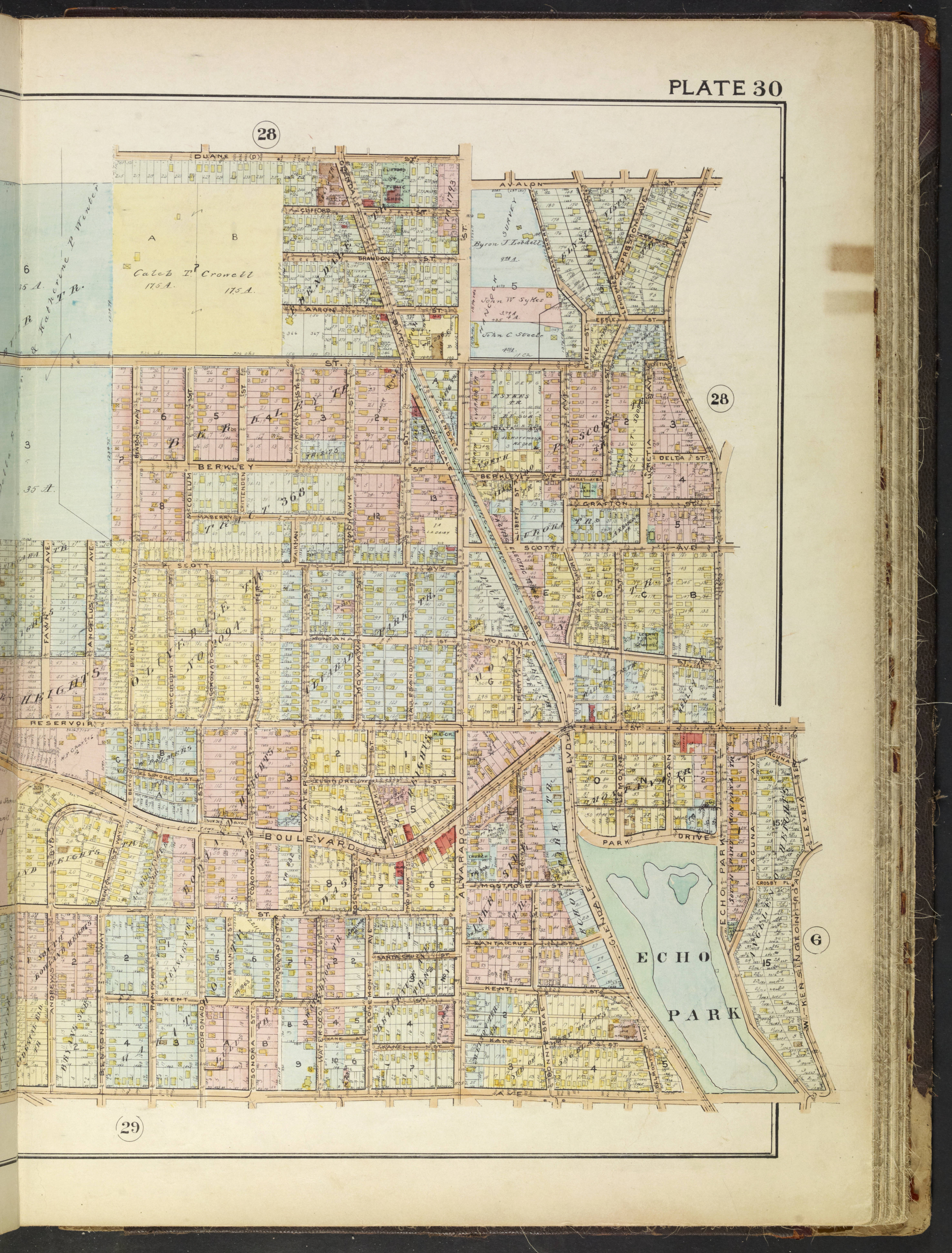
1921

=== Location ===
According to the Los Angeles Times "Mapping L.A." project, Echo Park is in Central Los Angeles, between Hollywood and Downtown Los Angeles. It is situated near the 101, the 2, and the 5 freeways. Echo Park is flanked by Elysian Valley to the north and northeast, Elysian Park to the east, Chinatown and Downtown to the southeast, Westlake to the southwest and west, and Silver Lake to the northwest.

Boundaries are the Golden State Freeway–Glendale Freeway interchange at the north apex, Riverside Drive on the northeast, Elysian Park neighborhood on the east, Stadium Way and Beaudry Avenue on the southeast, the south apex being Beaudry Avenue and West Second Street and the west limit being an irregular line consisting of Second Street and Beverly Boulevard, then moving upward north along Benton Way and the Glendale Freeway.

=== Climate ===
Being in the central part of Los Angeles, Echo Park experiences a hot-summer Mediterranean climate (Csa). Temperatures here are almost identical to that of Downtown Los Angeles.

Climate data for Echo Park, Los Angeles
Month	Jan	Feb	Mar	Apr	May	Jun	Jul	Aug	Sep	Oct	Nov	Dec	Year
Record high °F (°C)	95 (35)	95 (35)	99 (37)	106 (41)	103 (39)	112 (44)	109 (43)	106 (41)	113 (45)	108 (42)	100 (38)	92 (33)	113 (45)
Mean maximum °F (°C)	83.3 (28.5)	84.3 (29.1)	85.8 (29.9)	91.2 (32.9)	89.7 (32.1)	90.2 (32.3)	94.1 (34.5)	95.3 (35.2)	98.9 (37.2)	95.5 (35.3)	88.0 (31.1)	81.4 (27.4)	102.7 (39.3)
Mean daily maximum °F (°C)	68.2 (20.1)	68.6 (20.3)	70.2 (21.2)	72.7 (22.6)	74.5 (23.6)	78.1 (25.6)	83.1 (28.4)	84.4 (29.1)	83.1 (28.4)	78.5 (25.8)	72.8 (22.7)	67.7 (19.8)	75.2 (24.0)
Daily mean °F (°C)	58.0 (14.4)	58.9 (14.9)	60.6 (15.9)	63.1 (17.3)	65.8 (18.8)	69.2 (20.7)	73.3 (22.9)	74.3 (23.5)	73.1 (22.8)	68.6 (20.3)	62.4 (16.9)	57.5 (14.2)	65.4 (18.6)
Mean daily minimum °F (°C)	47.8 (8.8)	49.3 (9.6)	51.0 (10.6)	53.5 (11.9)	57.1 (13.9)	60.3 (15.7)	63.6 (17.6)	64.1 (17.8)	63.1 (17.3)	58.7 (14.8)	52.0 (11.1)	47.2 (8.4)	55.6 (13.1)
Mean minimum °F (°C)	41.3 (5.2)	42.9 (6.1)	44.9 (7.2)	48.4 (9.1)	53.6 (12.0)	57.2 (14.0)	61.2 (16.2)	61.8 (16.6)	59.2 (15.1)	54.1 (12.3)	45.0 (7.2)	40.8 (4.9)	39.1 (3.9)
Record low °F (°C)	28 (−2)	28 (−2)	31 (−1)	36 (2)	40 (4)	46 (8)	49 (9)	49 (9)	44 (7)	40 (4)	34 (1)	30 (−1)	28 (−2)
Average rainfall inches (mm)	3.12 (79)	3.92 (100)	2.43 (62)	0.91 (23)	0.26 (6.6)	0.09 (2.3)	0.01 (0.25)	0.04 (1.0)	0.24 (6.1)	0.66 (17)	1.04 (26)	2.33 (59)	15.05 (382.25)
Source: The Weather Channel

=== Districts ===
Within Echo Park are the following:

==== Angelino Heights ====
Angelino Heights is most notable for its Victorian era residences, although these are few in number. It lies at an elevation of 502 feet (153 m).

==== Elysian Heights ====
Since the 1910s, Elysian Heights, along with Edendale, has been home to many of the counter-culture, political radicals, artists, writers, architects and filmmakers. The children of many progressives attended school there during the 1930s, 1940s and 1950s.

== Population ==
=== 2000 ===
The 2000 U.S. census counted 40,455 residents in the 2.4-square-mile (6.2 km^{2}) neighborhood—an average of 16,868 people per square mile, one of the highest densities in Los Angeles and among the highest densities for the county. In 2008 the city estimated that the population had increased to 43,832. The median age for residents was 30, about the same as the city norm.

Echo Park was considered moderately diverse ethnically. The breakdown was Hispanic and Latino Americans, 64%; Asian Americans, 18.8%; Non-Hispanic Whites, 12.9%; African Americans, 2%; and others, 2.3%. Mexico (41.3%) and El Salvador (15.2%) were the most common places of birth for the 53% of the residents who were born abroad, a figure that was considered high compared to the city as a whole.

=== 2008 ===
In 2008, the median household income in U.S. dollars was $37,708, a low figure for Los Angeles, and a high percentage of households earned $20,000 or less. The average household size of three people was about the same as the rest of the city. Renters occupied 76% of the housing units, and house- or apartment owners the rest.

The percentages of never-married men and women, 46.8% and 38.3%, respectively, were among the county's highest. The 2000 census found 5,325 families headed by single parents, a high rate for both the city and the county. There were 1,034 military veterans in 2000, or 3.5%, a low figure for Los Angeles.

=== 2010 ===
The 2010 U.S. census estimates that the neighborhood demographics for tract 1974.20 are as follows: Latinos still form the majority of the community, though the percentage fell from 69.8% in 2000 to 59.5% in 2010; Whites grew from 13.2% in 2000 to 23.2% in 2010; Asian population remained almost unchanged at 13.3% in 2010 compared to 13.2% in 2000; Other grew from 3.4% in 2000 to 4% in 2010. The number of people in the district shrank by almost 15% to around 3,500 people. This represents less than 10% of the number of residents considered to live in Echo Park. The demographic shift from Latino to White is generally acknowledged as the overall trend in the area.

== Parks and recreation ==
=== Parks ===
==== Elysian Park ====
Elysian Park is one of the largest parks in Los Angeles at 600 acres (240 ha). It is also the city's oldest park, founded in 1886 by the Elysian Park Enabling Ordinance. Most of Elysian Park falls in the Eastern neighborhood of the same name, but a small portion of the park does fall in Echo Park.

- Angels Point, a small hill in Elysian Park overlooking Dodger Stadium and the Downtown Los Angeles Skyline. Atop the hill is a large metal sculpture art installation by local artist Peter Shire of the 1980s postmodern Memphis Group.
- Chavez Ravine Arboretum, opened in 1893 and contains more than 100 varieties of trees from around the world, including what are believed to be the oldest and largest Cape Chestnut, Kauri, and Tipu trees in the United States.
- Grace E. Simons Lodge, an event space with waterfalls and reception rooms.
- Marion Harlow Memorial Grove is a small tree and plant grove along the Elysian Park hiking trail.

==== Echo Park Lake ====
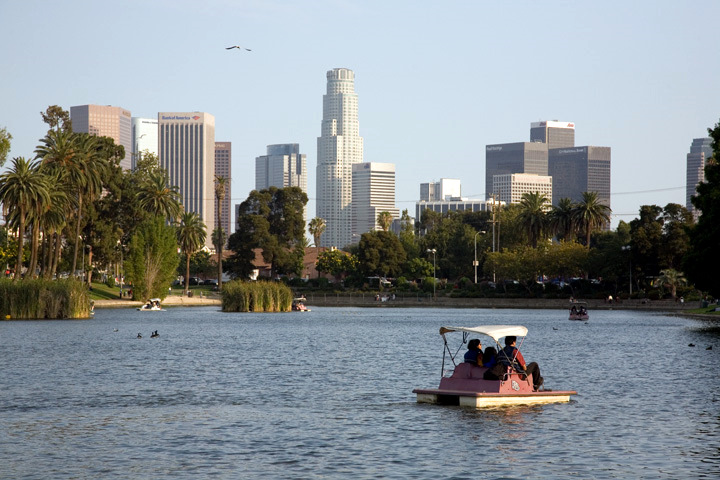
Echo Park, with the Downtown Los Angeles skyline in the background

Echo Park Lake provides recreational features and wildlife habitat, including wetlands. Echo Park Lake hosts community events, such as the annual Lotus Festival every July.

- Echo Park boathouse restaurant and more than a dozen swan shaped paddle boats
- Picnic tables, BBQ pits, public restrooms, water fountains, and grassy picnic areas
- 1-mile long looping promenade paved walking trail around the lake

==== Vista Hermosa Natural Park ====
Vista Hermosa Natural Park is a 10.5 acres (4 ha) urban natural park that features walking trails, streams, meadows, oak savannahs, picnic grounds, sweeping views of Downtown Los Angeles skyline, and a nature-themed playground amid native Mediterranean vegetation.

=== Sports facilities ===
- Chavez Ridge Disc Golf Course (in Elysian Park)
- Echo Park Deep Pool (indoor pool)
- Echo Park Recreation Complex
  - Facility Features: Baseball Diamond (Lighted), Basketball Courts (Lighted / Indoor), Basketball Courts (Lighted / Outdoor), Children's Play Area, Community Rooms, 6 Tennis Courts (Lighted), Stage, Picnic Tables, Indoor Gym (without Weights), Skate park (opening in 2020)
- Echo Park Youth Center
- Elysian Fields (2 baseball diamonds in Elysian Park)
- Elysian Park Adaptive Recreation Center (in Elysian Park)
  - Facility Features: Basketball Courts (Unlighted / Outdoor), Children's Play Area, Indoor Gym (with Weights), Amphitheatre, Indoor Gym (without Weights), Classroom(s), Stage
- Vista Hermosa Synthetic Soccer Field (lighted)

== Government and infrastructure ==
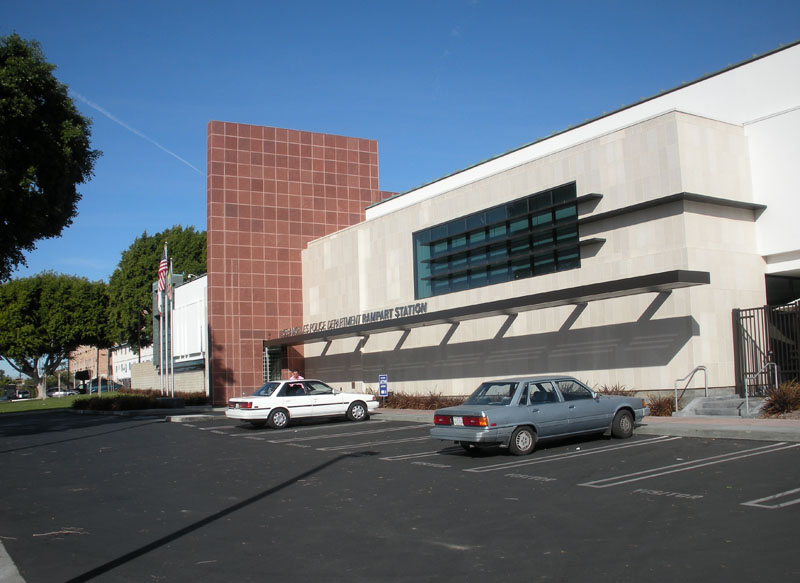
Rampart Police Station

=== Local government ===
Echo Park is split between Los Angeles's 13th City Council district under Councilmember Hugo Soto-Martinez and Los Angeles's 1st City Council district under Councilmember Eunisses Hernandez.

Echo Park Neighborhood Council meets regularly on a weekly basis to discuss local important issues and goings on in Echo Park. There are leadership roles with Executive Committee and breakout committee positions like Budget and Finance, Homelessness and Housing, or Planning and Land Use. Anyone in the neighborhood may contribute to the meetings or process through public comment or volunteering.

Echo Park Recreation Complex has a Park Advisory Board, which consists of the complex director, 3 elected officer positions, and 6 other general board members.

The Los Angeles Fire Department Station 20 is in the area.

The Los Angeles Police Department (LAPD) operates the Rampart Community Police Station at 1401 West 6th St., 90017, located near Echo Park in the Westlake district of east-central Los Angeles. LAPD also operates an LAPD Police Academy training facility Including a weapons firing range in Elysian Park adjacent to Dodger Stadium.

=== Local community groups ===
Echo Park has various community groups that contribute to its well-being through volunteer action. Some of those groups include The Echo Park Improvement Association, Echo Park Chamber of Commerce, Echo Park Trash Club, and Echo Park Historical Society.

=== County, state, and federal representation ===
Echo Park sits in the following governmental districts:

- 1st County District of Los Angeles County Board of Supervisors, under Supervisor Hilda Solis
- 24th State Senate District, under California State Senator Maria Elena Durazo
- 52nd State District of the California State Assembly, under California State Assemblymember Jessica Caloza
- 30th Federal Congressional District, under Representative Laura Friedman

The Los Angeles County Department of Health Services operates the Central Health Center in Downtown Los Angeles, serving Echo Park.

The United States Postal Service Edendale Post Office is located at 1525 North Alvarado Street.

=== Public libraries ===
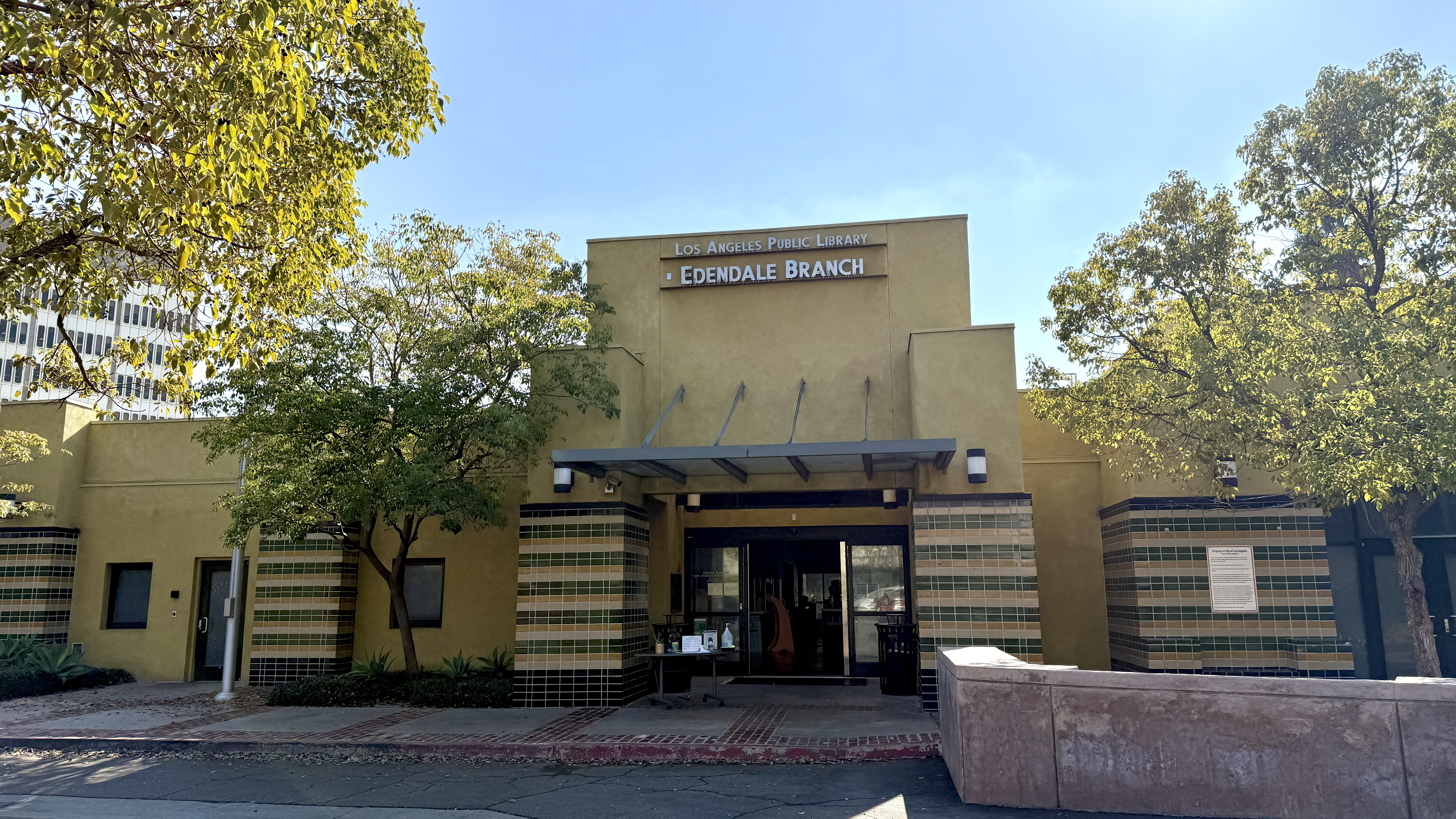
Edendale Branch on Sunset Boulevard

The Los Angeles Public Library operates two branches in Echo Park: Echo Park Branch and Edendale Branch.

== Education ==
Echo Park is part of the Los Angeles Unified School District. It is home to ten schools, including the famous home of a cat named Room 8.

=== Public schools ===
- Elysian Heights Elementary School, 1562 Baxter Street
- Clifford Street Elementary School, 2150 Duane Street
- Mayberry Street Elementary School, 2414 Mayberry Street
- Gabriella Charter School, 1435 Logan Street
- Logan Street Span School, 1711 W Montana Street
- Rosemont Elementary School, 421 N Rosemont Avenue
- Betty Plasencia Elementary School, 1321 Cortez Street

=== Private schools ===
- Baxter Montessori, 2101 N Echo Park Avenue
- DC Academy, 626 Coronado Terrace
- Golden West Christian Preschool, 1310 Liberty Street

== Entertainment and nightlife ==
=== Food and drink ===
The trendy Echo Park area, known for its nightlife and as one of "the city's hippest neighborhoods", has many bars, nightclubs, and restaurants. The sprawling historic Taix French restaurant (originally known as Les Freres Taix) has been a landmark in the community since moving to 1911 Sunset Boulevard from downtown Los Angeles in 1964. The 321 Lounge cocktail bar inside the restaurant has hosted live music and comedy for many years and is a longtime destination for Los Angeles Dodgers fans to congregate before or after a baseball game. In the third annual New York Times Restaurant List, of the five California restaurants featured, two are based in Echo Park: the Korean-inspired Perilla LA and the pizzeria Quarter Sheets.

=== Points of interest ===
- 3-D Space, a museum dedicated to 3-D technology and media
- Avenue of the Athletes, a Walk of Fame dedicated to athletes

== Notable people ==
- Veronica Porché Ali, psychologist and former wife of boxer Muhammad Ali
- Carlos Almaraz, artist
- Austin Amelio, actor
- Conor Oberst, musician
- Allison Anders, film and television director
- Tom Bradley, politician, athlete, police officer, and lawyer who served as the 38th Mayor of Los Angeles from 1973 to 1993
- Jackson Browne, musician
- Anna Camp, actress
- Charlie Chaplin, actor, comedian, composer, writer, film director
- Frances Conroy, actress
- Alice Cooper, musician
- Jeffrey Davies, musician
- Lana Del Rey, musician, model, music video director.
- Mac DeMarco, musician
- Leonardo DiCaprio, actor
- William Ferguson (1822–1910), member of the Los Angeles Common Council
- Glenn Frey, musician
- Eric Garcetti, Los Angeles mayor
- Erica Garcia, Argentine rock singer-songwriter
- Seth Green, actor
- Alex Gruenenfelder, filmmaker and author
- Kim Gruenenfelder, author
- Roy Hampton, Los Angeles City Council member, 1939–41
- Hand Habits, musician
- Marilyn Horne, soprano, lived at 1565 Altivo Way
- John Huston, film director
- Art Ingels, inventor of the Go-Kart
- Touko Laaksonen (AKA Tom of Finland), artist
- Paul Landacre, artist, lived at 2006 El Moran Street
- Sasha Lane, actress, model
- Shia LaBeouf, actor, writer, artist
- Solomon Lazard (1827–1916), entrepreneur, banker and politician
- Henry Jay Lewis, musical conductor
- Estelle Lawton Lindsey, newspaper columnist and Los Angeles City Council member, lived at 2414 Echo Park Avenue
- Edward Middleton Manigault, painter
- Aimee Semple McPherson, evangelist and founder of Foursquare Church
- Steve McQueen, actor, lived on Vestal Avenue in 1955
- Carey McWilliams author, editor and lawyer
- Alessandro Nivola, actor, bought and lived in Angelino Heights Victorian home in 2002
- Molly Parker, actress
- Lil Peep, musician lived here from 2016 to his death in 2017
- Art Pepper, jazz musician
- Ariel Pink, musician
- Leo Politi, artist and illustrator
- James Wesley Potts, merchant, landowner and member of the Los Angeles Common Council; noted locally as an amateur weatherman nicknamed "The Prophet."
- Margaret Qualley, actress, dancer.
- Sara Ramirez, actress
- Charles Rappleye, American writer, investigative reporter and newspaper editor.
- Ann Robinson, actress and stunt horse rider
- Horatio Sanz, comedian, actor, ex-SNL cast member and podcaster.
- Mack Sennett, writer, film producer, film director, studio executive
- Peter Shire, Memphis Group artist
- Sia, musician, writer
- Roger L. Simon, novelist and screenwriter. His fictional detective, Moses Wine, also lived in Echo Park.
- Grace Simons, activist for Elysian Park
- Brando Skyhorse, author, lived on Portia Street
- Brian Smith, director, producer, and screenwriter
- Elliott Smith (1969–2003), musician, singer, songwriter
- JD Souther, musician
- Avey Tare, musician
- Darwin William Tate, Los Angeles City Council member, 1933–39
- Danny Trejo, actor
- Valentina, drag queen
- Clare Vivier, fashion designer
- Eric Wareheim, actor, comedian
- Clara Kimball Young, silent film actress
- Frank Zappa, musician and songwriter, lived at 1819 Bellevue Ave
- Jacob Zeitlin, bookseller, opened an antique book shop at 1623 Landa Street

== In popular culture ==
=== Film ===
- Twenty Minutes of Love is a 1914 short silent film starring Charlie Chaplin, set at the Echo Park Lake.
- Recreation is a 1914 short silent film starring Charlie Chaplin, which takes place at Echo Park Lake.
- The Academy Award-winning 1974 American neo-noir mystery film Chinatown, directed by Roman Polanski, has a scene taking place in Echo Park. In the movie's third-most-famous scene, Jake (Jack Nicholson) pretends to photograph his associate as a cover for snapping Hollis and Katherine, while boating on Echo Park Lake.
- Echo Park is a 1986 American comedy-drama film directed by Robert Dornhelm and written by Michael Ventura, set in Echo Park. The plot follows several aspiring actors, musicians, and models.
- Alligator II: The Mutation is a 1991 American monster horror film directed by Jon Hess, shot at the Echo Park Lake.
- Mi Vida Loca is a 1993 American drama film directed and written by Allison Anders, centered on the lives of young Mexican-American cholas and Chicanas (and their male counterparts) growing up in Echo Park.
- The Fast And The Furious is a 2001 American crime action-adventure film directed by Rob Cohen starring Paul Walker, Vin Diesel, and Michelle Rodriguez. Vin Diesel plays Dominic Toretto, a street racer who lives in Echo Park. Many scenes take place there including at Bob's Market in Angelino Heights and a meet up in the parking lot of Dodger Stadium.
- Training Day is a 2001 American crime thriller film directed by Antoine Fuqua, starring Denzel Washington and Ethan Hawke as two LAPD narcotics officers who patrol over a 12-hour period in the gang-ridden neighborhoods of Echo Park, Westlake, and South Central Los Angeles.
- Quinceañera is a 2006 American drama film about gentrification in Los Angeles, centered on Echo Park.
- The 2008 American crime drama film Columbus Day, starring Val Kilmer, features a recurring scene at the Echo Park Lake.
- The 2011 American action drama film Drive, directed by Nicolas Winding Refn, is set primarily in Echo Park. The protagonist, "The Driver", lives in Echo Park and meets many other characters in and around the area.
- Echo Park is a 2014 American drama romance film directed by Amanda Marsalis, set in Echo Park.
- A Star Is Born is a 2018 American musical drama film directed by Bradley Cooper, starring Bradley Cooper and Lady Gaga. Lady Gaga's character, Ally, lives with her father in the Angelino Heights district of Echo Park.

=== Television ===
- The Bench Episode 004 with Huell Howser, filmed in 1996
- The main character Jimmy played by Stephen Falk in the 2014 FX show You're The Worst lives in Silver Lake, and much of Echo Park is featured in the show as the main characters visit nearby businesses.
- The 2016 Netflix series Love is primarily set in Echo Park.
- The 2017 reboot of the sitcom One Day at a Time is set in Echo Park.
- The television series Chuck is mainly set in Echo Park.
- The 1998 The WB series Chamed is set in San Francisco but it's house is in Angelino Heights.

=== Literature ===
- Echo Park is a 2006 crime fiction novel set mostly in Echo Park. It's the 17th novel by American crime-writer Michael Connelly and the twelfth featuring the Los Angeles detective Hieronymus "Harry" Bosch.
- The award-winning book "The Madonnas of Echo Park: A Novel" by Brando Skyhorse follows a Hispanic family rattled by a tragic event in their home of Echo Park. The story focuses on the marginalized men and women who cook the meals, clean the homes, and struggle to lose their ethnic identity in the pursuit of the American dream. In 2012, HBO was in talks to produce a drama series based on the book.
- The Echo Park Coven Novels book series written by Buffy the Vampire Slayer actress Amber Benson, which includes #1 The Witches of Echo Park (2015), #2 The Last Dream Keeper (2016), and #3 The End of Magic (2017) is a trilogy of fantasy novels about a coven of young witches that live in Echo Park.
- Part of the book Tomorrow, and Tomorrow, and Tomorrow written by Gabrielle Zevin takes place in Echo Park. One of the lead characters, Sam Masur, grows up there with his mother.

=== Music ===
- Keith Barbour released an album, Echo Park, in 1969, which hit No. 163 on the Billboard 200, and the title track, written by Buzz Clifford, hit No. 40 on the Pop Singles chart.
- The 1976 song Carmelita by Warren Zevon references Echo Park by name and he sings of meeting his heroin dealer who "hangs out down on Alvarado Street by the Pioneer Chicken stand."
- The 1980 song "I Die: You Die" by Gary Numan references it: "In Echo Park, I / Pause for effect and whisper 'Who are you?'"
- The 1980s song "Echo Park" by Brian Setzer is a studio outtake released in 1999 and references the local lake, "I used to swim in Echo Park Lake all night."
- British rock band Feeder named their 2001 album after the area. It became their breakthrough album going platinum in the United Kingdom.
- The 2004 song "Echo Park" by Ryan Cabrera is about Echo Park with lyrics such as, "Today it rained in L.A....I'm leaving my heart here in Echo Park."
- The 2009 music video for the song "End Love" by the rock band OK Go was filmed at Echo Park Lake and made one of the local geese a celebrity.
- The 2009 music video for the song "Hey, Soul Sister" by the rock band Train was filmed in front of the Del Mor apartments and what used to be Chango Coffee.
- The 2011 song "Echo Park" by Ximena Sariñana is about a man she likes from Echo Park who is a hipster and 'superficially cool.' with lyrics, "I thought he was ready to mend my broken heart...till someone reminds me that he lived in Echo Park" and in an interview Sariñana says, the reason for including Echo Park in the name and lyrics is a way to display 'a superficial motive for falling in love with someone.'
- The 2017 song "Scott Street" by Phoebe Bridgers is about Scott Avenue. It's a quaint residential stretch that the song's subject, Marshall, travelled to make a daily pilgrimage to buy cigarettes.
- The 2017 song "Up in Hudson" by Dirty Projectors about long-distance lovers mentions Echo Park in the lyrics, "And you're out in Echo Park, blasting 2Pac, drinking a fifth..."
- The 2018 song "King of Echo Park", from TV Girl's album Death of a Party Girl, is about Echo Park including the lyrics, "As the sun sets on Sunset" (Blvd), and "Now she's playing pool at the Little Joy." (a local bar)
- The 2018 song "Jaws" by Bladee mentions the location twice in the lyrics, "Night call, Echo Park"
- The 2019 song "Echo Park" by Bedouine is about Echo Park with lyrics including, "Where everybody's avant-garde," "Long as my rent don't climb, I'm living in Echo Park," (Echo Park's demographic began heavily shifting in 2000 and rents reached an all-time high by 2017) and "Oh, I long to be at the fountain and the lake."
- The 2021 song "Made Your Mark" by Hail the Sun references Echo Park by name.
- The 2022 song "Echo Park" by Tim Baker.
- The music video for the song "Step by Step" by Eddie Chacon was filmed in Echo Park.

== See also ==
- List of Los Angeles Historic-Cultural Monuments in Silver Lake, Angelino Heights, and Echo Park
- List of districts and neighborhoods in Los Angeles
