= Ned R. Healy =

American politician

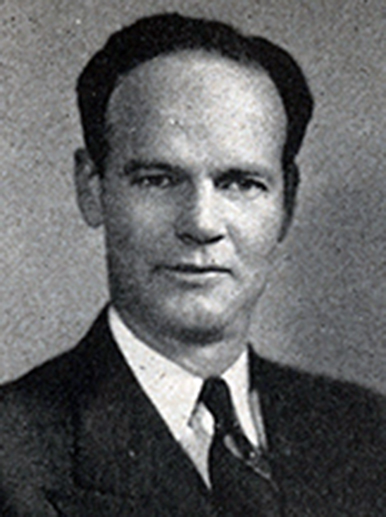

Member of the U.S. House of Representatives from California's 13th district
- In office January 3, 1945 – January 3, 1947
- Preceded by: C. Norris Poulson
- Succeeded by: C. Norris Poulson

Member of the Los Angeles City Council from the 13th district
- In office July 1, 1943 – January 1, 1945
- Preceded by: Roy Hampton
- Succeeded by: Meade McClanahan

Personal details
- Born: Ned Romeyn Healy; August 9, 1905 Milwaukee, Wisconsin
- Died: September 10, 1977 (aged 72) Long Beach, California
- Party: Democratic
- Spouse: Helen Nelson
- Children: 3
- Education: University of Wisconsin–Madison; Marquette University
- Profession: dealer in auto parts and accessories

Ned Romeyn Healy (August 9, 1905 – September 10, 1977) was a member of the Los Angeles City Council from 1943 to 1945 and a member of Congress from 1945 to 1947.

== Biography ==
Healy was born August 9, 1905, in Milwaukee, Wisconsin, where he attended public schools and Marquette University. He also studied at the University of Wisconsin–Madison, in which city he was a stock and bond salesman from 1929 until he moved to Los Angeles in 1932, where he was in merchandising and office management. He was director of the Hollywood office of the California State Relief Administration in 1939 and 1940.

== Political life ==
Healy was a delegate to the Democratic State Convention in 1944, 1946 and 1948.

=== City Council ===
==== Election ====
In 1943 Los Angeles City Council District 13 lay south and west of Downtown Los Angeles, bounded roughly on the east by Sheffield Street, the south by Valley Boulevard, the west by Vermont Avenue and the north by an irregular line from Pullman Street to Fountain Avenue.

Healy ran for election in District 13 against the incumbent, Roy Hampton. In the heat of the campaign, Hampton made a charge in 30,000 fliers circulated "on the eve of the municipal primary" that Healy had at one time been a registered member of the Communist Party. Healy went to the city attorney's office and demanded issuance of a complaint against Hampton for criminal libel, and Hampton quickly made an "unequivocal retraction" of his charge. The record does not show whether Hampton had confused Ned R. Healy with local labor leader Don R. Healy, whom Hampton had accused of being a communist just three years previous.

Another challenger was Kay Cunningham, who missed beating Ned Healy for second place and a runoff position by only 18 votes.

Healy went on to victory over Hampton in the 1943 runoff vote, but he quit the council in 1944 after winning election to the House of Representatives that fall. The city council decided to leave the seat unfilled until the next municipal vote, in 1945.

==== Positions ====
Healy was a New Dealer who in 1943 unsuccessfully opposed granting a permit to Seaboard Oil Company for slant oil drilling under Elysian Park from a site near Riverside Drive.

He also fought for a December 1943 resolution honoring Bill of Rights Week that would have put the council on record as opposed to discrimination "against minority groups" and encouraging broadest "racial" unity. Other members of the council objected to those two terms, and, after a two-hour debate, they were eventually deleted and the motion was adopted, 10–5, in opposition to any form of discrimination and in favor of general unity and tolerance.

=== U.S. House of Representatives ===
In 1944, he successfully ran for a seat in the U.S. House of Representatives, serving one term from 1945 to 1947. He was defeated for re-election in 1946 by Norris Poulson. In 1948, Healy challenged Poulson again, but lost the rematch.

== Later career and death ==
After his Congressional service ended in 1943, he returned to Los Angeles, where he became a dealer in auto parts and accessories until 1969.

Healy died September 10, 1977. His body was cremated and the ashes scattered at sea.

== Electoral history ==
1944 United States House of Representatives elections in California
Party	Candidate	Votes	%
Democratic	Ned R. Healy	66,854	55
Republican	Norris Poulson (Incumbent)	54,792	45
Total votes		121,646	100
Turnout			
Democratic gain from Republican			

1946 United States House of Representatives elections in California
Party	Candidate	Votes	%
Republican	Norris Poulson	48,071	51.8
Democratic	Ned R. Healy (Incumbent)	44,712	48.2
Total votes		92,783	100.0
Turnout			
Republican gain from Democratic			

1948 United States House of Representatives elections in California
Party	Candidate	Votes	%
Republican	Norris Poulson (Incumbent)	62,951	52.6
Democratic	Ned R. Healy	56,624	47.4
Total votes		119,575	100.0
Turnout			
Republican hold			

Preceded by Roy Hampton	Los Angeles City Council; 13th District; 1943–44	Succeeded by Meade McClanahan

U.S. House of Representatives
Preceded by C. Norris Poulson	Member of the U.S. House of Representatives from California's 13th congressional district 1945–1947	Succeeded by C. Norris Poulson
