= Los Angeles's 13th City Council district =

American legislative district

Councilmember
Hugo Soto-Martinez; D–East Hollywood
since December 12, 2022
- Demographics: 25.6% White; 3.6% Black; 51.1% Hispanic; 17.0% Asian; 0.4% Other
- Population (2020): 255,414
- Registered voters (2017): 119,832
- Website: cd13.lacity.gov

Los Angeles's 13th City Council district is one of the fifteen districts in the Los Angeles City Council. It is currently represented by Democrat Hugo Soto-Martinez since 2022, after beating previous councilmember Mitch O'Farrell that year.

The district was created in 1925 after a new city charter was passed, which replaced the former "at large" voting system for a nine-member council with a district system with a 15-member council.

== Geography ==
The district flanks the 101 freeway as it passes through part of Hollywood and north to Hollywood Boulevard in East Hollywood. The district's southern boundary includes the neighborhoods of Silver Lake, Echo Park, and Westlake; and north through Echo Park and western Elysian Park in the eastern Santa Monica Mountains; to Atwater Village, Elysian Valley, and a section of the Los Angeles River within its northeastern borders. It is geographically the smallest council district in Los Angeles and the most densely populated council district.

The district is completely within California's 30th congressional district and overlaps California's 26th and 24th State Senate districts as well as California's 51st and 52nd State Assembly districts.

=== Historical boundaries ===
The 13th district was mapped at its origin in 1925 in the eastern part of the city, but over the years it has been shifted west in keeping with the city's population changes. That year, it was in the eastern part of the city, covering Monterey Hills, Montecito Heights, Elysian Park and part of Echo Park. It was described as the "North End, extending to Mt. Washington Drive, Avenue 44 and Marmion Way." The district headquarters was at 3014 Terry Place in Lincoln Heights. In 1940, the district extended westward to Vermont Avenue and south to Valley Boulevard.

In 1960, it took over most of Hollywood and extended from the Alhambra city limits to Fairfax Avenue. By 1964, Hollywood, Silver Lake, Echo Park and portions of Los Feliz and Lincoln Heights were a part of the district. In 1973, the district bordered Eagle Rock on the east and reached into Hollywood on the west. In 1986, after several attempts at redrawing councilmanic districts in accordance with a U.S. court order to provide for increased Latino representation, the City Council in 1986 adopted a plan that stripped Chinatown, Echo Park and adjoining areas from the 13th District but kept Hollywood and Silver Lake and also cut north into Studio City. The result was a decided shift to the north and west, including part of Studio City within the San Fernando Valley and all of Coldwater Canyon. The eastern boundary was roughly the east edge of Elysian Park.

== List of members representing the district ==
Councilmember	Party	Dates	Electoral history
District established July 1, 1925
Joseph F. Fitzpatrick (Lincoln Heights)	Democratic	July 1, 1925 – August 21, 1925	Elected in 1925. Suspended after a bribery indictment.
Vacant		August 21, 1925 – October 23, 1925	
Carl I. Jacobson (Lincoln Heights)	Republican	October 23, 1925 – June 30, 1929	Appointed to finish Fitzpatrick's term. Elected in 1927. Re-elected in 1929. Re-elected in 1931. Lost re-election.
Darwin W. Tate (Echo Park)	Democratic	July 1, 1933 – June 30, 1939	Elected in 1933. Re-elected in 1935. Re-elected in 1937. Retired.
Roy Hampton (Echo Park)	Democratic	July 1, 1939 – June 30, 1943	Elected in 1939. Re-elected in 1941. Lost re-election.
Ned R. Healy (Echo Park)	Democratic	July 1, 1943 – January 2, 1945	Elected in 1943. Resigned when elected to the U.S. House of Representatives.
Vacant		January 2, 1945 – April 6, 1945	
Meade McClanahan (Silver Lake)	Republican	April 6, 1945 – March 19, 1946	Elected to finish Healy's term. Elected to full term. Lost recall election.
Vacant		March 19, 1946 – March 25, 1946	
John R. Roden (Silver Lake)	Democratic	March 25, 1946 – June 30, 1947	Elected to finish McClanahan's term. Lost re-election.
Ernest E. Debs (Silver Lake)	Democratic	July 1, 1947 – December 1, 1958	Elected in 1947. Re-elected in 1949. Re-elected in 1951. Re-elected in 1953. Re-elected in 1957. Resigned when elected to the County Board of Supervisors.
Vacant		December 1, 1958 – July 1, 1959	
James H. Brown (Larchmont)	Democratic	July 1, 1959 – December 28, 1964	Elected in finish Debs's term. Re-elected in 1961. Resigned to become a municipal court judge.
Vacant		December 28, 1964 – July 1, 1965	
Paul H. Lamport (Hollywood)	Democratic	July 1, 1965 – June 30, 1969	Elected to finish Brown's term. Elected to a full term. Lost re-election.
Robert J. Stevenson (Hollywood)	Democratic	July 1, 1969 – March 4, 1975	Elected in 1969. Re-elected in 1973. Died.
Vacant		March 4, 1975 – May 27, 1975	
Peggy Stevenson (Hollywood)	Democratic	May 27, 1975 – June 30, 1985	Elected to finish her husband's term. Re-elected in 1977. Re-elected in 1981. Lost re-election.
Michael Woo (Silver Lake)	Democratic	July 1, 1985 – June 30, 1993	Elected in 1985. Re-elected in 1989. Retired to run for Mayor of Los Angeles.
Jackie Goldberg (Echo Park)	Democratic	July 1, 1993 – December 4, 2000	Elected in 1993. Re-elected in 1997. Resigned when elected to the California State Assembly.
		December 4, 2000 – July 1, 2001	
Eric Garcetti (Echo Park)	Democratic	July 1, 2001 – June 30, 2013	Elected in 2001. Re-elected in 2005. Re-elected in 2009. Retired to run for Mayor of Los Angeles.
Mitch O'Farrell (Echo Park)	Democratic	July 1, 2013 – December 12, 2022	Elected in 2013. Re-elected in 2017. Lost re-election.
Hugo Soto-Martinez (East Hollywood)	Democratic	December 12, 2022 – present	Elected in 2022. Re-elected in 2026.
