= Julius Stone Jr. =

American public administrator (1901–1967)

Julius Frederick Stone, Jr. (1901–1967) was an American public administrator. He was instrumental in reviving Florida's Key West from bankruptcy following a devastating hurricane in 1935.

== Biography ==
Stone was born on April 18, 1901 in Columbus, Ohio to Julius and Edna Stone. Stone Sr. was the president of Ohio State University Research Foundation and the chairman of the board of the Seagrave Corporation. Stone's early education was spent at North High, Columbus, Ohio. He obtained his undergraduate degree from Ohio State University in 1922 and his masters from Harvard University in 1923.

== Key West Revival ==
In 1934, Stone was serving as the director of the Federal Emergency Relief Administration (FERA) for the southeastern United States. Freshly minted Florida Governor David Sholtz turned to him to address the Key West's financial distress. Its cigar manufacturing industry was just hit by the Great Depression and the naval base there was also reduced to a skeleton crew. Scholtz declared a state of "civil emergency" and transferred municipal authority to FERA and Stone was given control.

Stone was faced with two options: shut the city down; or, revitalize it based on its current assets despite the exodus of the city’s population. He decided to pursue the latter and avoided the town to be forcibly turned into a park, with its people relocated. He appropriated more than $1 million from FERA for this purpose.

Some of Stone’s notable initiatives was the organization of volunteers, which cleaned up the city, which then was suffering from months of uncollected garbage. He was able to round up more than 4,000 members (including then Mayor William Malone and his wife), who also conducted tree-planting in addition to the city-wide cleanup drive. To further reawaken community spirit, he launched several projects including publicizing the city to attract visitors and create jobs. He held festivities such as the two-day ceremony honoring Cuban patriots in 1934. His efforts staved off an almost certain financial crisis for Key West and transformed the city into a vacation destination.

For his work in Key West, it is said that Stone became the inspiration for Captain Frederick Harrison, a character in Ernest Hemingway’s To Have and Have Not, a novel set in 1930s Key West. Hemingway, a conservative Republican, and, Stone, a staunch believer of the New Deal respectively, did not see eye to eye over the local administration of Key West.
