= Peter Shire =

American artist

- Born: 1947 (age 78–79); Los Angeles, California
- Known for: Sculpture, Public sculpture, Ceramic art, Furniture design
- Movement: Memphis Group

Peter Shire (born 1947) is a Los Angeles–based artist. Shire was born in the Echo Park district of Los Angeles, where he currently lives and works. His sculpture, furniture and ceramics have been exhibited in the United States, Italy, France, Japan and Poland. His work includes a sculpture in Elysian Park to honor the work done by Grace Simons and Peter Glass, which kept the park open as green space.

Shire has been associated with the Memphis Group of designers, has worked on the Design Team for the 1984 Summer Olympics with the American Institute of Architects, and has designed public sculptures in Los Angeles and other California cities. Shire has been honored with awards for his contributions to the cultural life of the City of Los Angeles.

In 2019, Shire's work was showcased at the Museum of Contemporary Art in Tucson, Arizona.
