= Avenue of the Athletes =

Walk of Fame honoring athletes in Los Angeles, California

- Location in Los Angeles
- Established: 1976
- Location: Sunset Boulevard, Los Angeles, California, U.S.
- Coordinates: 34.0770°N 118.2584°W
- Founder: L. Andrew Castle

Avenue of the Athletes is a walk of fame located in the Echo Park neighborhood of Los Angeles, California. It honors athletes, many of whom are Olympians, most of whom have some connection to Los Angeles.

== Description ==
Avenue of the Athletes is a Walk of Fame that consists of thirty-two 17-by-16-inch (43 cm × 41 cm) sidewalk-embedded brass plaques, each featuring an athlete's name and a symbol related to their sport. Many of the honorees are Olympians and most of them have some connection to Los Angeles.

The Walk is located in Echo Park, on Sunset Boulevard between Mohawk Street and Laveta Terrace.

== History ==
Local business owner, professor, and Los Angeles Dodgers and Tournament of Roses photographer L. Andrew Castle started Avenue of the Athletes in the 1970s in an attempt to bring tourists to Echo Park. The city, Dodgers, Echo Park Chamber of Commerce, and neighboring businesses all backed the endeavor, which was inspired by the nearby Hollywood Walk of Fame.

The location for Avenue of the Athletes was declared in 1974 and Castle inducted two classes, one in 1976 and the other in 1977. Castle died the following year, and after his death, the Avenue was not updated again until 1985, when four plaques were added, one of which was for Castle himself. No plaques have been added since.

== Honorees ==
Avenue of the Athletes honorees include:

=== Aquatics ===
- Sammy Lee
- Pat McCormick
- John Naber

=== Baseball ===
- Sandy Koufax
- Tommy Lasorda
- Jackie Robinson
- Babe Ruth

=== Basketball ===
- Kareem Abdul-Jabbar
- Elgin Baylor
- Frank Lubin

=== Boxing ===
- Joe Louis
- Jimmy McLarnin
- Armando Muniz

=== Tennis ===
- Billie Jean King
- Ellsworth Vines

=== Track and field ===
- Rafer Johnson
- Jesse Owens
- Bob Seagren
- Wyomia Tyus

=== Other ===
- Andrew Castle (sports photographer and creator of the Avenue)
- Kenny Washington (gridiron football)

== See also ==
- List of Halls and Walks of Fame
