= Gabriella Charter Schools =

Public charter schools in Los Angeles, California

- Los Angeles, California

Information
- Type: Charter school
- Website: www.gabriellacharterschools.org

Gabriella Charter Schools are a set of two public charter schools, based in Los Angeles, California. The schools are known for a strong emphasis on dance for all students, and are named for the founder's thirteen-year-old daughter Gabriella, who died in 1999.

In 2013, a report from the University of Southern California listed Gabriella as the number two charter elementary or middle school in California.

== History ==
Liza Bercovici founded Everybody Dance after the death of her only daughter, Gabriella, in a 1999 car crash. Dance instructor Carol Zee led the nonprofit dance program, which inspired Bercovici to start her own charter school in the vein of the Camino Nuevo Charter Academy, where many youth from the program went to school. The school's goal was to have high academic standards, while providing ballet, jazz, and contemporary dance programs to pair.

Gabriella has become a major subject of the battle over charter schools and their colocation in the Los Angeles Unified School District. In April 2024, the LAUSD Board passed restrictions on colocation that could remove Gabriella from campuses, which was subsequently challenged in court by the California Charter Schools Association as a violation of 2000 California Proposition 39.

== Campuses ==
- GCS 1 (Echo Park)
  - 1435 Logan Street, Los Angeles, CA 90026
- GCS 2 (Downtown Los Angeles)
  - GCS 2 Lower: 3736 Trinity Street, Los Angeles, CA 90011
  - GCS 2 Upper: 4312 S Grand Ave, Los Angeles, CA 90037
