= Joseph F. Fitzpatrick =

American politician

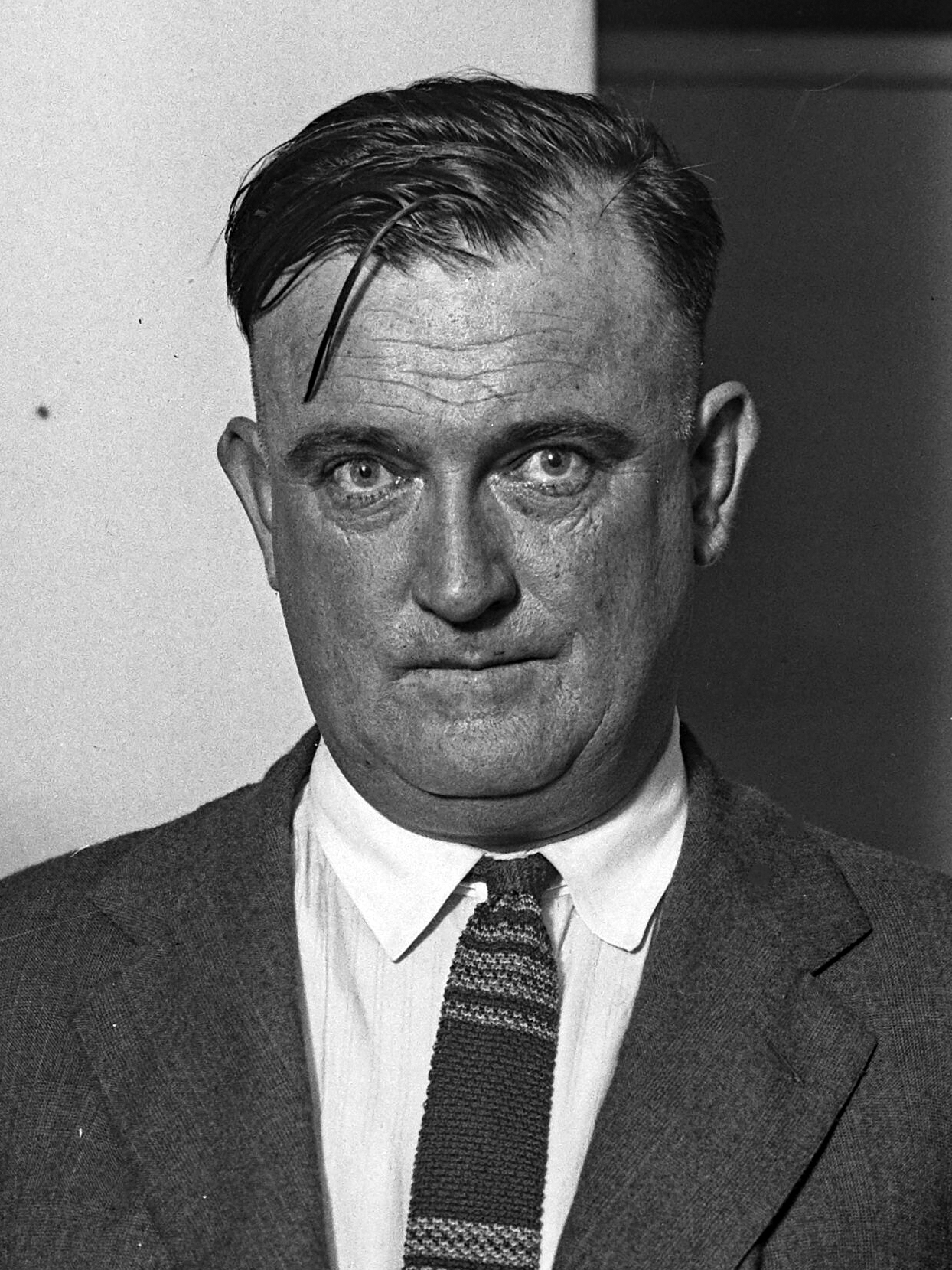
- Fitzpatrick in 1925

Member of the Los Angeles City Council for the 13th district
- In office July 1, 1925 – August 21, 1925
- Preceded by: District established
- Succeeded by: Carl Ingold Jacobson

Personal details
- Born: March 3, 1882 Los Angeles, California, U.S.
- Died: August 18, 1940 (aged 58)
- Party: Democratic

Joseph F. Fitzpatrick (March 3, 1882 – August 18, 1940) was an American politician who was the first Los Angeles City Council member representing the 13th District after a new city charter went into effect in 1925. He did not finish his term, however, after he was convicted in that year of receiving a bribe from a developer who planned to construct a "moving sidewalk" within the Second Street Tunnel.

== Political career ==
In June 1925, Fitzpatrick, "a figure in labor and fraternal circles," was the successful candidate in the newly formed 13th District. In the general election, Fitzpatrick was elected by a minority vote of 3,722 to 3,044 for Carl Jacobson and 2,405 for Joseph L. Pedrotti.

=== Arrest ===
Meanwhile, the former City Council had awarded a franchise to the Tunnels Transportation Company to build a moving sidewalk within the Second Street Tunnel, with seats, "on each side of which would be a public sidewalk." Fitzpatrick and Charles E. Downs, both new council members, said they were opposed to the project, but, according to William Hodges, vice-president of Tunnels Transportation, one of Downs's tenants — Jack Murphy, or J. Howard Murphy — told Hodges that the councilmen's votes could be obtained.

Hodges went to Downs's office and asked him what was expected, to which Downs is said to have replied: "It's long and flat and green," and he drew a rectangle on the back of an envelope. The same day, Hodges said, he notified Council President Boyle Workman, and he then worked with District Attorney Asa Keyes and Chief Deputy D.A. Buron Fitts to lay a trap for the two councilmen.

On August 18, 1925, the new council was set to adopt ordinances for the project, but Downs and Fitzpatrick objected to an immediate vote, stating they had an "important appointment" to keep. The appointment at Downs's City Hall office was with Hodges, who passed each of the councilmen $1,000 in marked bills, wrapped in torn magazine pages. As Hodges left the room, he raised his hat as a signal to police officers hiding in the hallway, and they placed both councilmen under arrest. Murphy was also arrested.

=== Trial and aftermath ===
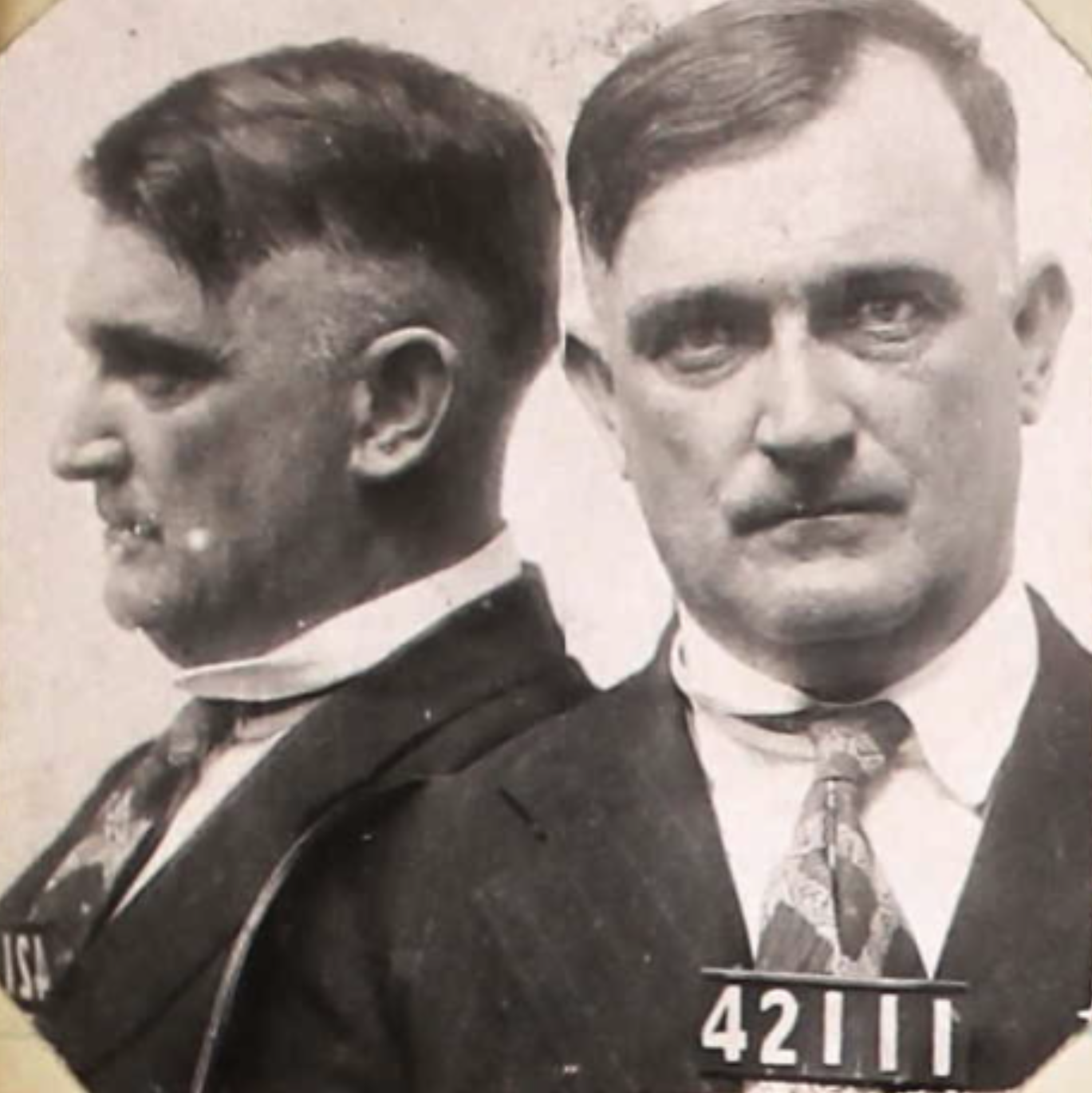
Fitzpatrick when admitted to San Quentin

Both councilmen were suspended from their offices while the trial was going on and were permanently removed upon their conviction. Downs testified at trial that he "accepted the money under the impression that it was a belated campaign contribution." After considerable discussion and some changing of votes, the jury unanimously found both Downs and Fitzpatrick guilty of bribery but asked the court to be lenient with them. "This, however, is impossible, as at the last session of the State Legislature a provision was included in the Penal Code denying probation to convicted public officials." The jury acquitted Murphy.

After conviction, the State Prison Board set Fitzpatrick's sentence at five years, with parole after half time.

When he was transferred to San Quentin State Prison on April 28, 1926, it was noted that he was six feet, 1-1/8 inch, with a fair complexion, black hair, and blue eyes.

He was released in December 1927 after serving about twenty months and went immediately to Kansas City. He was granted a full pardon by Governor James Rolph in December 1933.

Preceded by District established	Los Angeles City Council; 13th district 1925	Succeeded by Carl Ingold Jacobson
