= Rayna Prohme =

American journalist in China

Rayna Prohme (1894 - 1927) was a journalist who covered the communist movement in China in the late 1920s.

== Biography ==
She was born Rayna Simons, the daughter of a successful Jewish businessman. She graduated from the University of Illinois in 1917, where she befriended Dorothy Day. Day's book, The Long Loneliness, describes their activities reading socialist novellas and joining the Socialist Party of America.

From 1918 to 1922 she was married to Samson Raphaelson, a marriage that ended in divorce. She later met and married William "Bill" Prohme who worked for William Randolph Hearst's San Francisco Examiner. They moved to China, where Prohme's sister, Grace Simons was working in China.

In 1926 she started working with Eugene Chen who was publishing the People's Tribune. Prohme and the American journalist Milly Bennett edited the People's Tribune in Hankou from 1926 until July 1927. While in China, Prohme was among the people admiring Mikhail Markowitsch Borodin, whom Lenin had sent to China in September 1923. Jointly Prohme and Bennett wrote a speech in which Soong Ching-ling, Sun Yat-sen's wife, resigned from her government position, and then Prohme helped her leave Hankou and make her way to Russia. Prohme also met the American screen writer Vincent Sheean in 1926 and he would eventually dedicate his memoir, Personal History, to Prohme whom he called "a marvelously pure flame". Within Personal History, Sheean talks about Prohme's work in China. He also talks about his relationship to her in an article published in the Atlantic Monthly.

Anna Louise Strong tried to help Prohme when she became ill; however, Prohme died on November 21, 1927, and was cremated in Russia. A book of Prohme's letters about her reporting during the Chinese Communist Revolution was published after her death.

== Selected publications ==
- Hirson, Baruch; Prohme, Rayna; Knodel, Arthur J. (2007-08-20). Reporting the Chinese Revolution: The Letters of Rayna Prohme. Pluto Press. ISBN 978-0-7453-2642-9.
