= Charles H. Crawford =

Alleged Los Angeles crime boss (1879–1931)

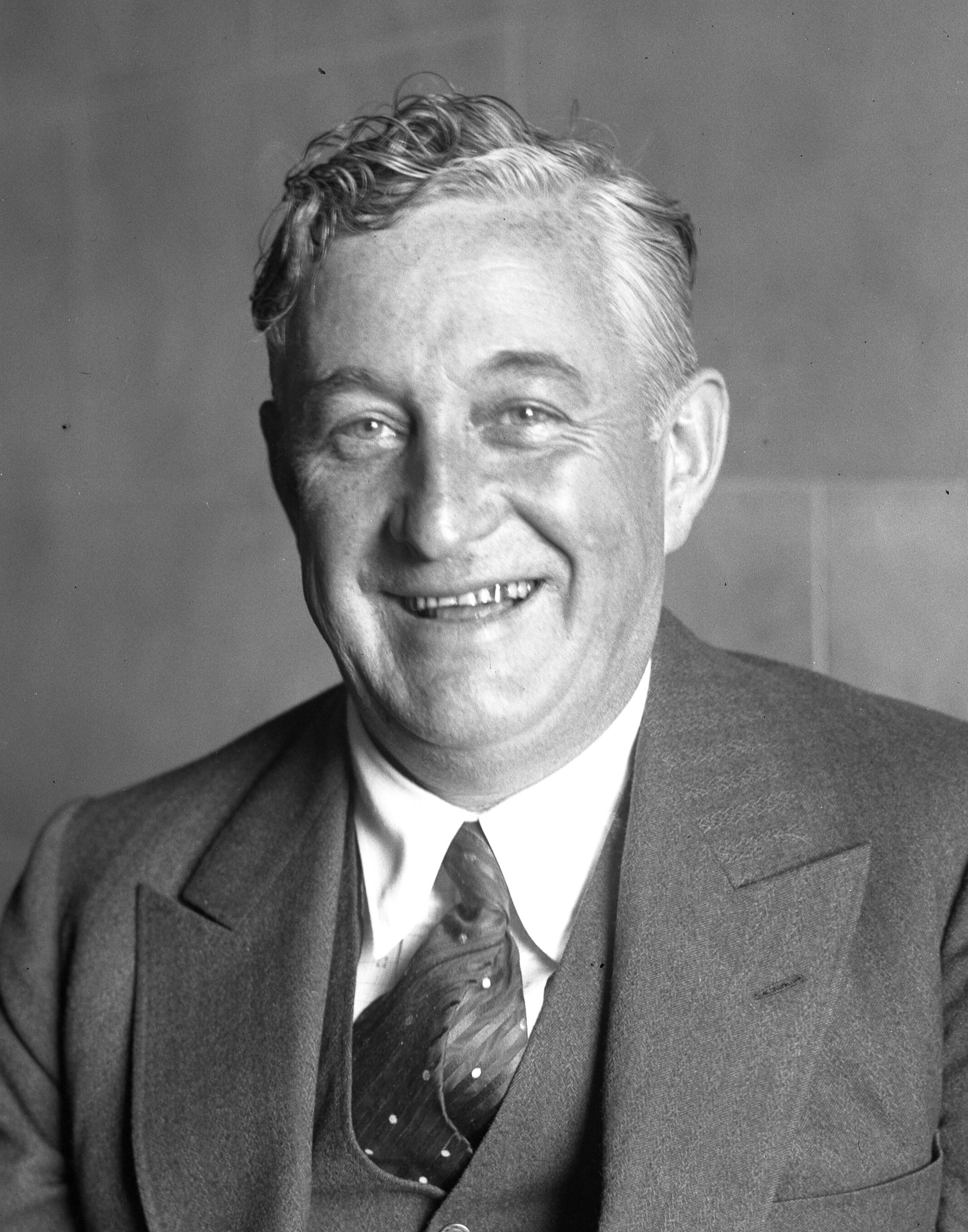
- Crawford in 1930
- Born: April 22, 1879; Youngstown, Ohio, U.S.
- Died: May 20, 1931 (aged 52); Los Angeles, California, U.S.
- Cause of death: Assassination

Charles H. Crawford (April 22, 1879 – May 20, 1931) was an American political figure. In the 1920s, his loosely organized crime syndicate in Los Angeles, California, was known as the "City Hall Gang". Crawford was reportedly a model for some of Raymond Chandler's villains.

== Early years ==
In the early 1900s, Crawford operated dance halls and saloons in Seattle, Washington. During the 1910s, Crawford moved to Southern California, where he opened a bar that reportedly also included a casino and bordello frequented by local politicians, judges and public officials. Eventually, Crawford developed a large vice operation in Los Angeles that included many casinos and bordellos.

Crawford developed a reputation for his political savvy and connections in the city's government and police department. With his connections, he was reportedly able to provide advance notice of raids to his criminal affiliates.

== City Hall Gang ==
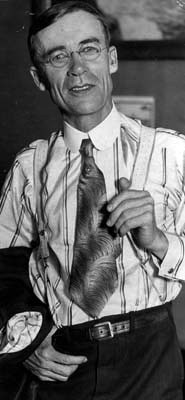
George E. Cryer was Mayor of Los Angeles during the period of Crawford's peak influence.

Crawford's influence peaked during the Prohibition era in Los Angeles. In 1921, Crawford's friend and political deal-maker, Kent Kane Parrot, concluded that prosecutor George E. Cryer, would be a suitable candidate for Mayor of Los Angeles. Parrot ran Cryer's campaign, which succeeded in defeating incumbent Mayor Meredith P. Snyder.

Between 1921 and 1929, Cryer was the city's mayor, with Parrot and Crawford operating behind the scenes. Many wrote that Cryer was a mere figurehead and that Parrot was the "de facto mayor" who also ran the Los Angeles Police Department, even transferring personnel without consulting with the city's police chief. The loosely organized crime syndicate operated by Parrot, Crawford, and a coterie of bootleggers and criminals became known for their influence over the city's government and were referred to as "the City Hall Gang" during the 1920s. Money from Crawford's vice operations flowed into the city government through Parrot.

Crawford became known as "the Gray Wolf of Spring Street". He was a colorful figure in Los Angeles during the Roaring Twenties, wearing a flamboyant wardrobe and flashy diamonds. When bootleggers and operators of other vice operations needed interference or assistance, the advice given was, "See Charlie about it." A historical account published by the Los Angeles Times described Crawford as follows:

Although physically imposing, Crawford had an effeminate voice and an Adam's apple that bobbed uncontrollably. His notorious viciousness and cunning helped take public corruption to a new level in Los Angeles city government in the 1920s.

== Indictments ==
By the late 1920s, the newspapers' criticism of corruption in the city's government became intense. Cryer elected not to run for re-election in 1929, and a new reform-minded mayor took office that year. With the Parrot-Kane machine no longer in power, Crawford's power waned in the early 1930s.

In 1929, Crawford was charged with "framing" a city councilman, Carl Ingold Jacobson. Prosecutors alleged that Crawford had conspired with five police officers and others to arrest the councilman on a trumped-up morals charge. The charges against Crawford were ultimately dismissed.

In 1930, Crawford was indicted for bribery in connection with a securities scandal involving the Julian Petroleum Corporation. Prosecutors alleged that Crawford and the former State Corporations Commissioner conspired to accept bribes in exchange for business privileges. Those charges were dismissed in October 1930 when the government's main witness refused to testify.

== Conversion and relationship with Rev. Briegleb ==
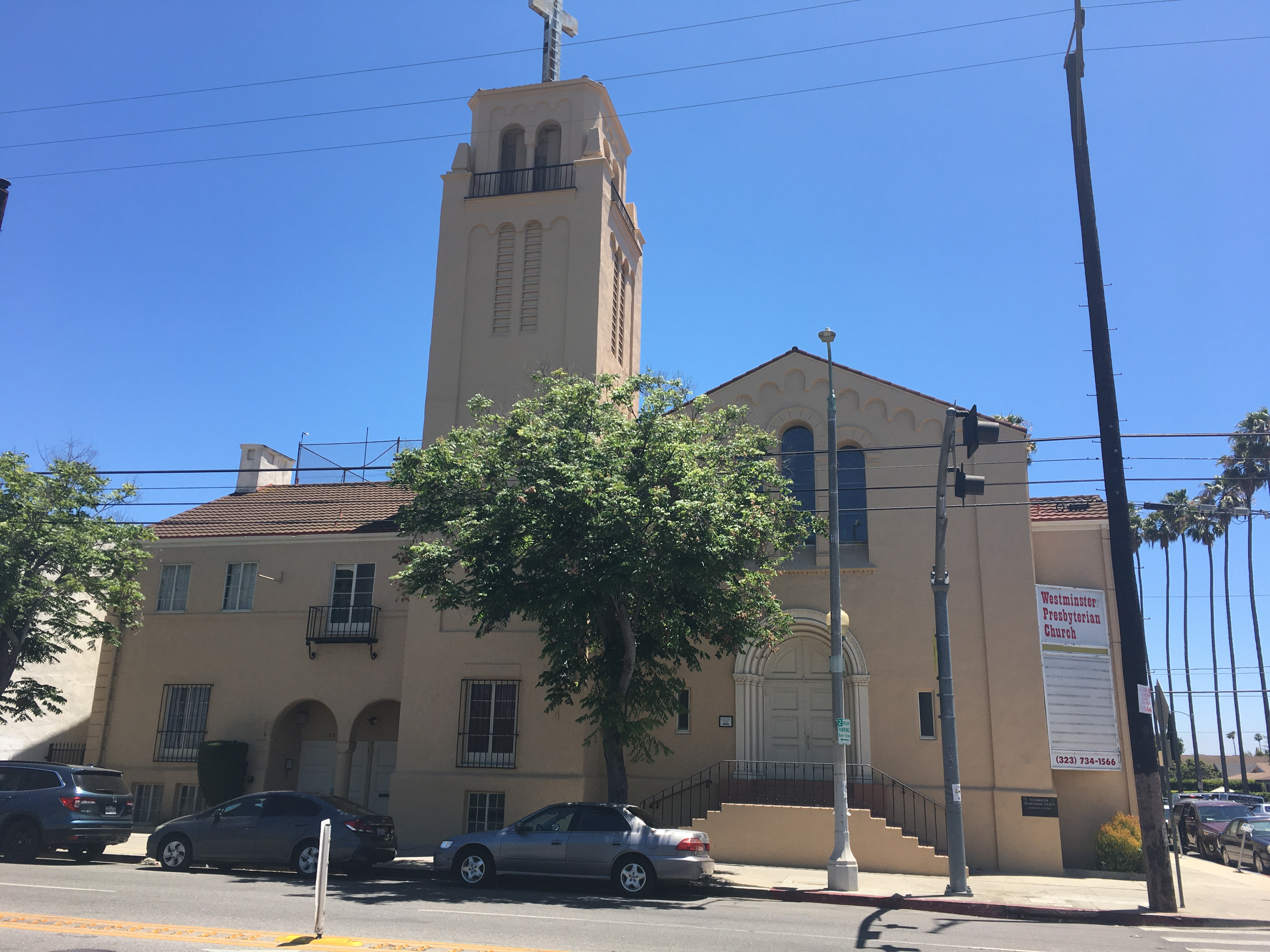
Westminster Presbyterian Church was built in 1931 as St. Paul's Presbyterian Church. Declared City of Los Angeles Historic-Cultural Monument No. 229 in 1980.

With Cryer and Parrot no longer in a position to assist him, Crawford sought legitimacy by opening an insurance and real estate office in Hollywood. He also funded a periodical magazine called "Critic of Critics" operated by newspaperman Herbert Spencer. The magazine was devoted to "diatribes against numerous individuals prominent in the public eye".

In June 1930, shortly after his indictment on bribery charges, Crawford was baptized and admitted into the membership of St. Paul's Presbyterian Church. The pastor at St. Paul's was Rev. Gustav A. Briegleb, the noted minister portrayed by John Malkovich in the 2008 film Changeling. On the day of his baptism, Crawford placed a ring set with two large diamonds, and valued at $3,500, in the collection plate at Briegleb's church. Accompanying the ring was a note from Crawford asking Briegleb to sell the ring and use the proceeds to help build a parish house.

In November 1930, Crawford made a further gift of $25,000 to be used in building a parish hall to be named Amelia Crawford House in honor of his mother. The press had noted that Crawford's conversion followed shortly after his indictment on bribery charges, but Briegleb noted that the $25,000 gift was not announced until after the bribery charges had been dismissed.

== Assassination ==
In May 1931, Crawford and Spencer were shot and killed during a daylight meeting at Crawford's private office at 6655 Sunset Boulevard. Crawford died several hours later at the hospital, as the bullet had ruptured his liver and one of his kidneys. Crawford regained consciousness before undergoing surgery, but declined to identify his assailant to the police. Crawford reportedly told the police that, if he had to die, the secret would go with him to the grave. Eyewitnesses provided a description of the assailant, and the police spread a "dragnet … in the sinister haunts of the city's underworld."

At the time of his death, a newspaper investigation found that Crawford was the recorded owner of automobiles and jewelry valued in excess of $280,000. He also had extensive real estate holdings, including a residence on North Rexford Drive in Beverly Hills and an entire block along Sunset Boulevard in Hollywood.

== Funeral ==
Crawford's funeral was an elaborate event covered in detail by the press and conducted by Rev. Briegleb at St. Paul's Presbyterian Church. Though the church held only 1,000, a crowd of more than 6,000 gathered outside the church for the funeral, in which newspapermen and police officials served as pallbearers. Crawford's silver-bronze casket was reported to have cost $15,000, and the church was filled with "a profusion of flowers, an assortment of wreaths, sprays, and pieces that took different forms and which cost thousands of dollars."

Rev. Briegleb delivered his eulogy for Crawford "through tear-dimmed eyes", as he told of Crawford's generosity to the church. He called Crawford a "true friend" and said the funeral was "the most difficult task I have ever faced in my twenty-five years as a minister." Briegleb later drew attention when he compared the life of Crawford to that of the Apostle Matthew. Briegleb noted that Matthew had begun as Levi the Politician and said the conversion of Crawford was almost identical to that of the apostle. Briegleb also criticized the press for its coverage of Crawford's death, noting, "We ought to let the dead sleep." Responding to criticism about taking gifts from such a notorious person, Briegleb said, "If you know of any more sinners who have $25,000, send 'em along; I can use it."

== Trial of David Clark ==
Several weeks after the shootings, David H. Clark, a prosecutor and candidate for judge, turned himself in to the police and admitted that he had shot Crawford and Spencer. His trial in August 1931 was attended by "the largest throng ever to attend a trial in Los Angeles." Clark testified that Spencer had threatened to have him killed if Clark continued his attacks on the underworld during his campaign for judge. After several threats, Clark claimed Crawford invited him to a meeting to fix things with Spencer. Clark asserted that Crawford asked him to take Chief of Police Steckel to the beach on a certain night as part of a plan to frame the chief. Clark claimed he refused to participate in the scheme and called Crawford a "dirty lowdown skunk" to his face. Clark testified that Crawford then pulled a gun, a scuffle followed, and he shot Crawford in self-defense.

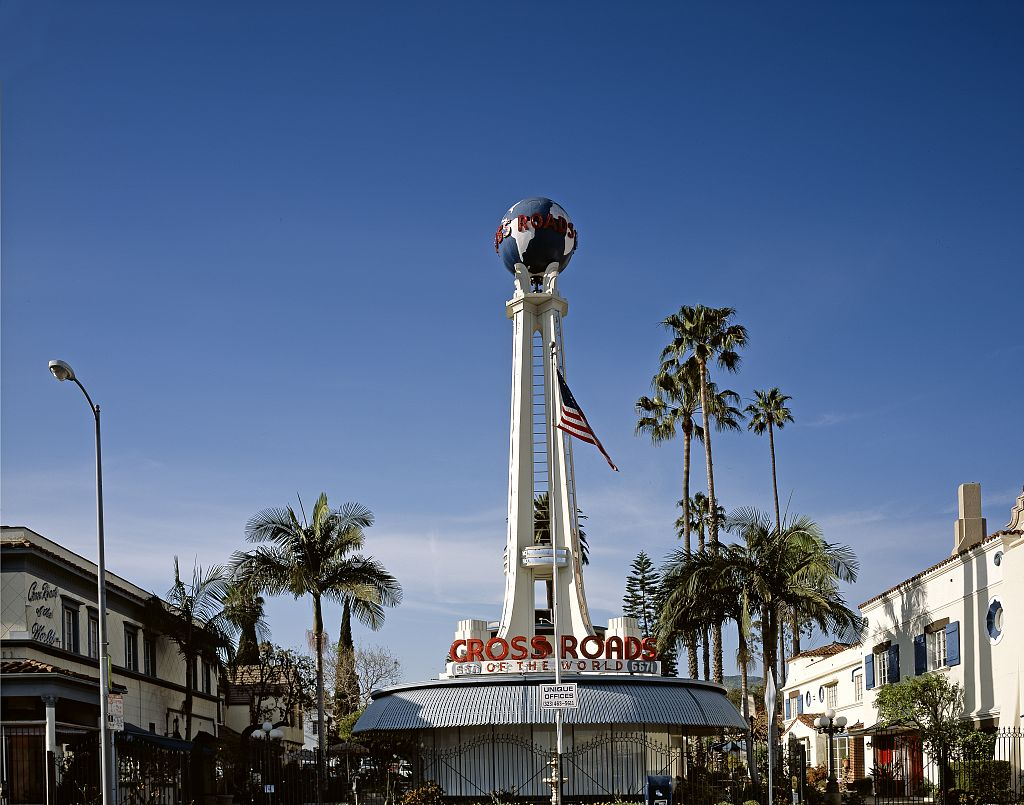
Crawford's widow built Crossroads of the World (pictured) on the site where Crawford was shot.

The prosecution disputed Clark's account, pointing out that the police found no guns in Crawford's office and offering testimony that investigators found a cigar, not a gun, in Crawford's dead hand. The prosecutor alleged that Clark carried out the assassination as the agent of one of Crawford's former criminal accomplices. Eleven of the twelve jurors found Clark not guilty, and the one juror who voted "guilty" reportedly "found a bomb on his front lawn the next day." Clark was acquitted of all charges at the retrial.

== Family and Crossroads of the World ==
Crawford was survived by his wife and two daughters, Joan, and Eleanor Gloria Crawford. In 1936, Crawford's widow built the historic Crossroads of the World, a shopping center shaped like a ship, on the site where Crawford was shot.

== See also ==
- Carl Ingold Jacobson, Los Angeles, California, City Council member, 1925–1933, whom Crawford was charged with framing
