= Darwin William Tate =

American politician (ca. 1889–1962)

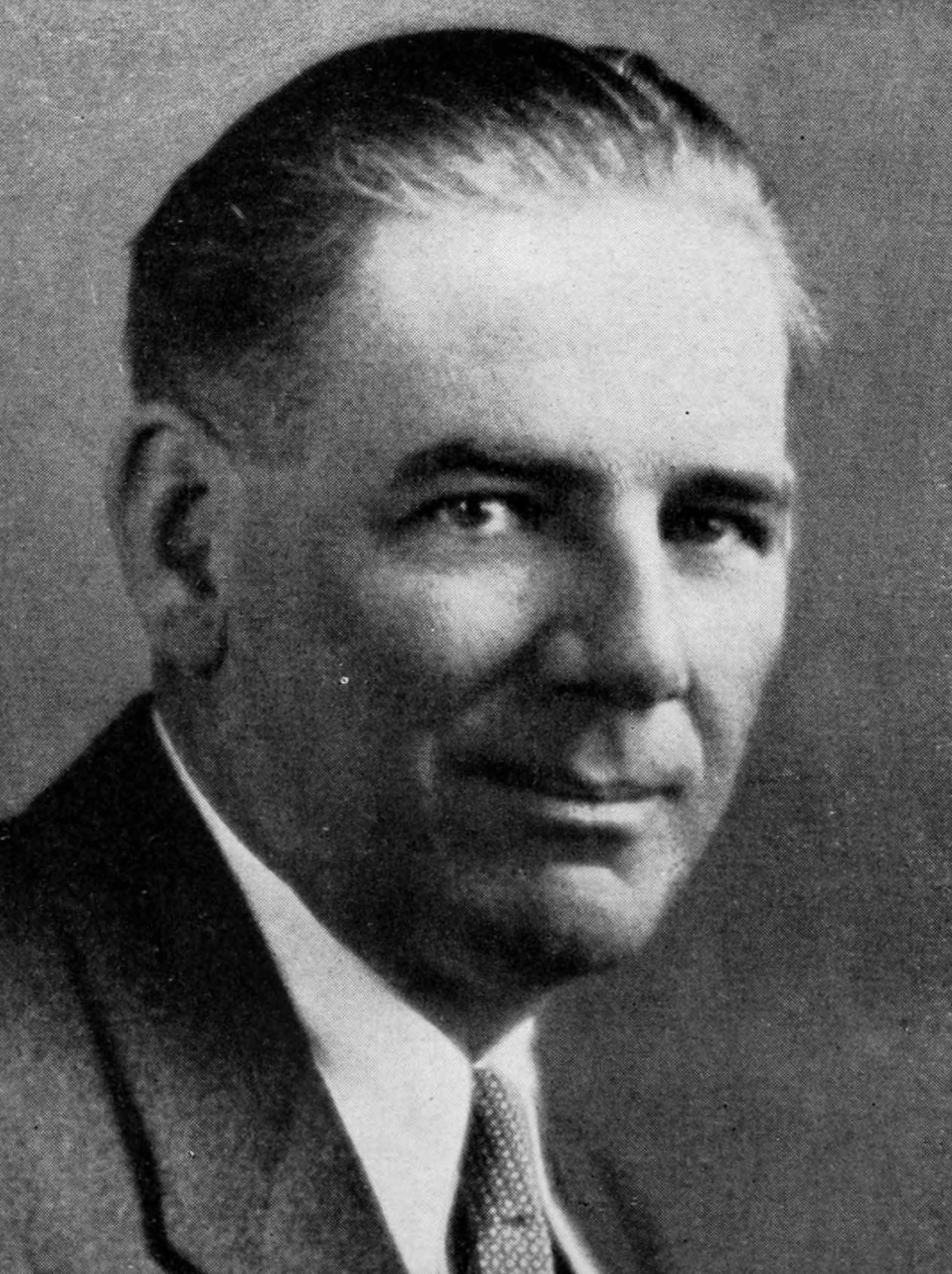
- Tate c. 1940

Chief of the California Division of Beaches and Parks
- In office July 1, 1939 – April 21, 1943
- Appointed by: Culbert Olson
- Preceded by: A. E. Henning
- Succeeded by: A. E. Henning

Member of the Los Angeles City Council for the 13th district
- In office July 1, 1933 – June 30, 1939
- Preceded by: Carl Ingold Jacobson
- Succeeded by: Roy Hampton

Personal details
- Born: April 22, 1889 Chicago, Illinois, U.S.
- Died: September 10, 1962 (aged 73) Norwalk, California, U.S.
- Party: Democratic
- Spouse: Leone
- Children: James; Margaret

Darwin William Tate (ca. 1889–1962) was a member of the Los Angeles City Council between 1933 and 1939 and chief of the California Division of State Beaches and Parks from 1939 to 1942.

== Biography ==
In the 1930s, Tate lived in the Echo Park area of Los Angeles, and was in several businesses, such as parking lots, horticulture and manufacturing. He was described in 1933 as a "tall, husky, quiet type of man." He was a Democrat. After his state service, he was a concessionaire at Corona del Mar State Park, operated by the city of Newport Beach.

He died of a heart condition in Norwalk, California, after undergoing surgery for a hip fracture. He was survived by his wife, Leone of Costa Mesa; a son, James; and a daughter, Mrs. Margaret Cain.

== Public service ==
=== City Council ===
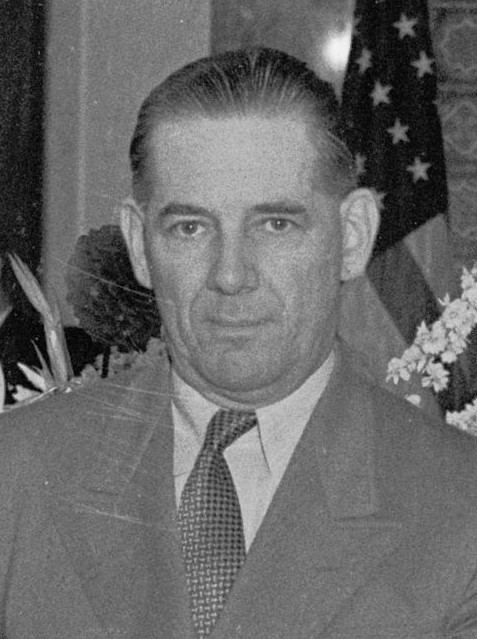
Tate in 1935

==== Elections ====
Tate ousted incumbent City Council member Carl Ingold Jacobson from his 13th District seat in 1933 and was reelected in 1935 and 1937. In that era the district had its east boundary at Sheffield Street, south at Alhambra Avenue, west at Benton Way and north in an irregular line from Pullman Street to Fountain Avenue. He left office in 1939.

==== Controversies ====
1934: Tate criticized the Federal Emergency Relief Administration for what he called a "new racket" in that, he said, it was planning to use the old Saint Vincent's Hospital on Sunset Boulevard near Beaudry Avenue "as a clearinghouse for transient youths." In the vicinity, he said, were "thousands of families who are denied Federal relief because they had sufficient ambition to acquire property" but became unemployed. He added: "If they must harbor these tramps, they should be taken out into the country where they won't interfere with the family life of our citizens."

1936: Tate was an anti-communist activist, and in 1936 he sought to justify a proposal prepared by him and Council Member Evan Lewis that would turn over to the Police Commission the granting of parade permits. He asked Police Lieutenant Luke Lane, head of the police intelligence unit to read out a list of names of people who had been arrested a few days before for gathering at the Plaza without a permit.

Lane stepped to the microphone with his records and declared that "Pat Callahan was district organizer for the Communist party in Phoenix, Ariz., in 1934."

"Just a minute," interrupted Epic Councilman [Parley Parker] Christensen, "this is an attempt to blacken a man's character and he should be present and be given an opportunity to be heard. This is America."

"Yes," shot back Councilman [Robert S.] Macalister, "that's why we think it is all right that the records of these men be known."

1936: Tate sponsored a measure that would have repealed the city's ordinance providing for setback lines in the construction of buildings, a measure that was opposed by the Southern California chapter of the American Institute of Architects.

=== State ===
Tate was appointed by Governor Culbert L. Olson as chief of the State Division of Beaches and Parks in 1939 and served until 1943. Tate was backed by the State Park Commission in a 4–1 vote, but was vehemently opposed by Los Angeles bookseller Ernest Dawson, who resigned from the commission in protest. Tate succeeded A.E. Henning, also a former L.A. City Council member.

In a February 1940 appearance before a State Assembly committee investigating "communistic influences" in the State Relief Administration, Tate said that he had begun to "worry about Communists filtering into the Democratic party."

Preceded by Carl Ingold Jacobson	Los Angeles City Council; 13th District; 1933–39	Succeeded by Roy Hampton
