= Roy Hampton =

American politician, attorney and journalist (c. 1901–1953)

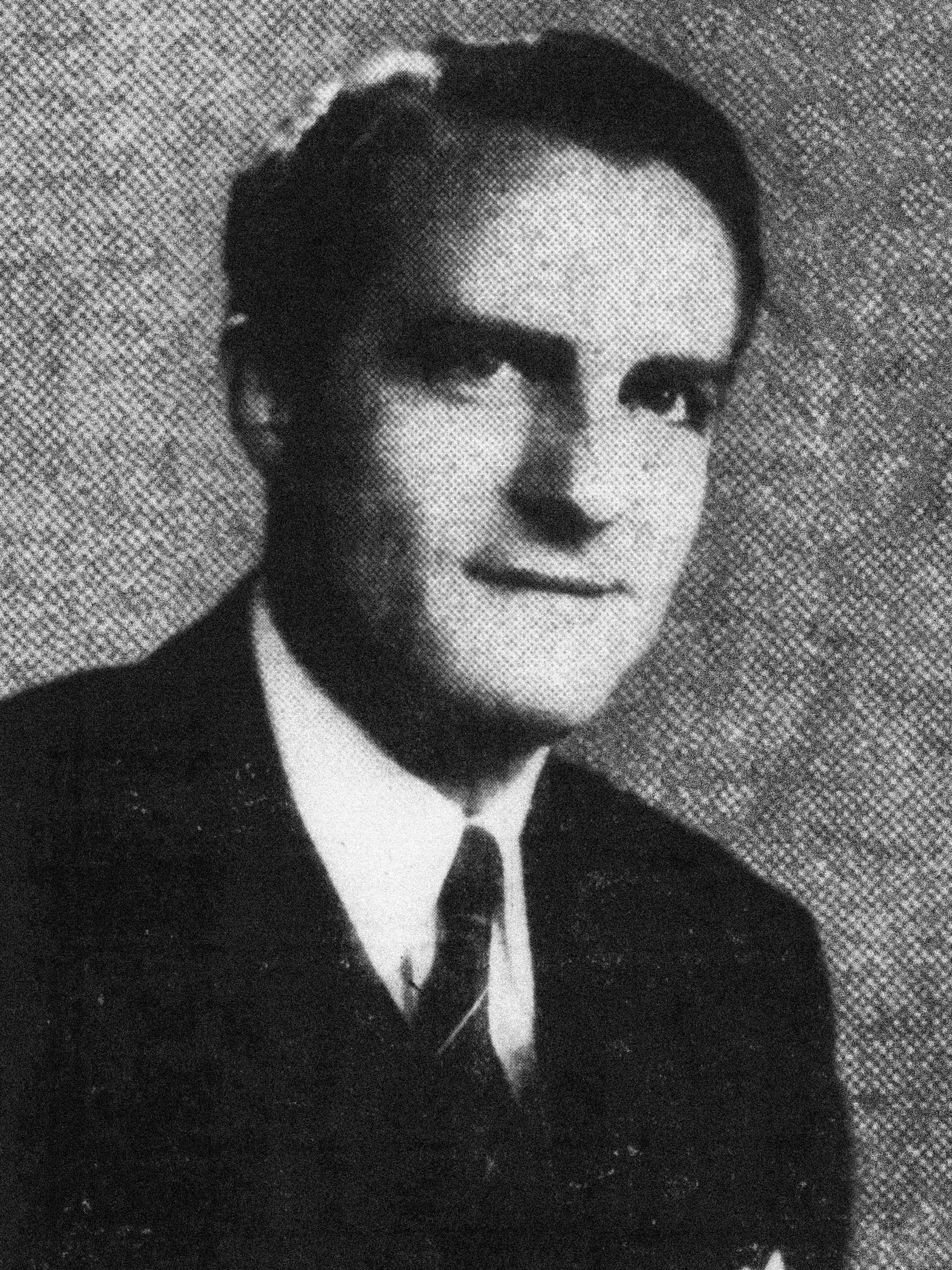
- Hampton in 1940

Member of the Los Angeles City Council for the 13th district
- In office July 1, 1939 – June 30, 1943
- Preceded by: Darwin William Tate
- Succeeded by: Ned R. Healy

Personal details
- Born: Leonard Roy Hampton; July 30, 1901 Jefferson County, Colorado, U.S.
- Died: April 16, 1953 (aged 51) Malibu, California, U.S.
- Cause of death: Suicide by gunshot
- Spouse: Elizabeth C. Stiles (m. 1924)
- Children: 1
- Education: University of Southern California (BA, JD)
- Occupation: Attorney; journalist

Leonard Roy Hampton (July 30, 1901 – April 16, 1953) was an attorney, ex-Marine and former journalist who was a member of the Los Angeles, California, City Council from 1939 to 1943. Sheriff's deputies said he killed himself in a Malibu motel in 1953.

== Biography ==
Hampton, who moved to Los Angeles about 1904, was a graduate of the University of Southern California and of its Law School and had worked as a journalist as well as an attorney. He was a Marine during World War II and was a member of the American Legion. Other memberships included the Echo Park and Elysian Park improvement associations. He lived in the 2400 block of Echo Park Avenue and then at 2354 Kenilworth Avenue.

Hampton's body was found in a motel at 19355 Pacific Coast Highway in Malibu on April 16, 1953. "A revolver lay at his side and Sheriff's deputies said he had taken his own life." A note blamed ill health for the act. Masonic funeral services were conducted. He was survived by his wife, Elizabeth; a son, Dirk; and his mother, Sadie Hampton.

== City Council ==
=== Elections ===
Hampton first ran for the Los Angeles City Council District 13 seat in 1931, when he finished eighth in a field of 11 candidates. He was elected in the same district in 1939 and again in 1941, but he lost to Ned R. Healy in 1943. In those years, the 13th District was essentially bounded on the east by Sheffield Street, the south by Valley Boulevard, the west by Vermont Avenue and the north by an irregular line from Pullman Street to Fountain Avenue.

=== Controversies ===
In Hampton's obituary, the Los Angeles Times said that the councilman "gained some note as a stormy petrel," speaking out against the Los Angeles Housing Authority, street railway operations, the Police and Civil Service Commissions and Mayor Bowron. He was among the early proponents of broadcasting City Council sessions."

==== Healy and Healy ====
In 1940 Hampton was the leader of an unsuccessful fight to have Mayor Fletcher Bowron remove Don R. Healy from a city charter revision committee on the grounds that Healy had been "an active member of the Communist party" since 1936. Healy told a three-member committee chaired by Hampton that he had indeed registered as a Communist in 1936 "but said he did so [only] to vote for a Communist candidate." The chief opponent to Hampton's demand was Councilman Arthur E. Briggs who said it was a "dirty and contemptible procedure, all too common in this community." Hampton retorted that Briggs, who had moved to California from Kansas in 1923, was a "self-confessed ward-heeler of the Pendergast political machine in Kansas City," a statement that Briggs called "absolutely false."

Three years later, in 1943, Hampton made a charge in 30,000 campaign fliers circulated "on the eve of the municipal primary" that Ned R. Healy, his opponent in the 13th District race, had been at one time a registered member of the Communist Party. Ned Healy went to the city attorney's office and demanded issuance of a complaint against Hampton on a charge of criminal libel, and Hampton soon made an "unequivocal retraction" of his charge. Healy went on to win the runoff election. The record does not show if Don and Ned R. Healy were related or if Hampton had confused the two.

==== Subversion ====
Hampton was the sponsor of Charter Amendment No. 12, approved by the voters in 1941, that forbade members of "subversive organizations" from working for the city. The authority was later used to discharge several employees of the city's Department of Water and Power.

==== Wire-tapping ====
In 1941, Hampton charged that Wallace N. Jamie, an investigator for Mayor Bowron, had established a wire-tapping "listening post" in the City Hall. Bowron called Hampton a "liar", and Hampton thereupon asked Attorney-General Earl Warren for an investigation because, he said, members of the mayor's and district attorney's offices were collaborating in a scheme of wire-tapping espionage in Los Angeles.

==== Police ====
He called for the ousting of Police Chief C.B. Horrell and the entire Police Commission in 1943 after the death of Stanley H. Beebe, a mortally injured accountant who made a deathbed statement that he had been beaten and kicked by policemen in the Central Jail.

Preceded by Darwin William Tate	Los Angeles City Council; 13th District; 1939–43	Succeeded by Ned R. Healy
