= 3-D Space =

Museum in Los Angeles

Coordinates: 34°04′41″N 118°15′46″W

3-D SPACE
- Established: 2018
- Location: Echo Park, Los Angeles, California
- Type: Media and technology museum
- Website: 3-dspace.org

3-D SPACE is a museum located at 1200 N. Alvarado St. in Echo Park, Los Angeles, California, dedicated to 3-D media and technology, including stereoscopic photography, art, and cinema.

== History ==
Eric Kurland opened the museum in 2018 as a non-profit organization. Among the museum's collections are holograms, View-Masters, VR goggles, 3-D books and movies, digital art and photography, and multiple generations of equipment and 3-D cameras. Examples include the antique Sculptoscope and Diableries and a prototype arcade kiosk called the Terryscope.
