= Carl Ingold Jacobson =

American politician

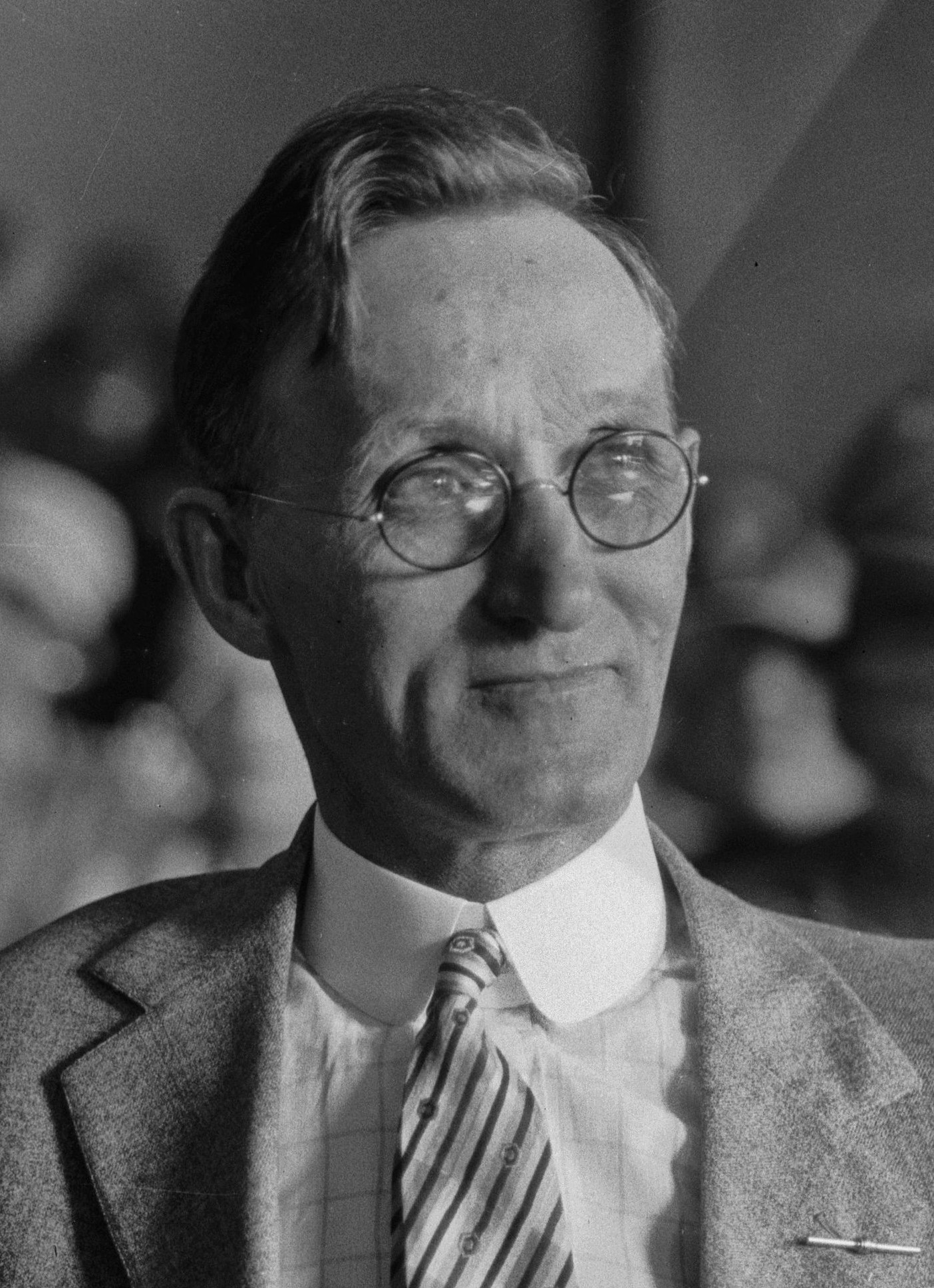
- Jacobson during his trial in 1927

Member of the Los Angeles City Council for the 13th district
- In office October 23, 1925 – June 30, 1929
- Preceded by: Joseph F. Fitzpatrick
- Succeeded by: Darwin William Tate

Personal details
- Born: March 12, 1877; Norway
- Died: January 13, 1960 (aged 82)
- Political party: Republican

Carl Ingold Jacobson (March 12, 1877 – January 13, 1960) was a City Council member from 1925 to 1933. He was tried on a morals charge, and then it was later shown that he was the victim of a frameup by local police authorities.

== Biography ==
Jacobson, born March 12, 1877, in Norway, was the son of Hans and Menkalie Jakobson and was brought to the United States at the age of 3. When he was grown, he worked for the Chicago & Northwestern Railroad as a laborer and later became an engineer. Jacobson went to college in Saint Paul, Minnesota, and in 1903-04 he organized a branch of the YMCA for the Missouri Pacific Railroad. He was married in 1906 to Rose Summersgill, and in 1909 they moved to Los Angeles, where Jacobson was an engineer for the Southern Pacific. They had one daughter, Dr. Edna Winter. He became a citizen in 1917. The family home in Los Angeles was at 3014 Terry Place in Lincoln Heights. A Republican and a Protestant, he dealt in real estate and insurance. His hobbies were golf, hunting and fishing. He was nicknamed "Jake".

== City Council ==
Jacobson ran for the 13th District seat in 1925, but failed of nomination in the May primary. A write-in campaign on his behalf, however, brought him within 13 votes of victory in the June general election over Joseph F. Fitzpatrick. The vote was 3,722 for Fitzpatrick, 3,710 for Jacobson and 2,405 for Joseph L. Pedrotti. The City Council, however, appointed Jacobson to the seat when Fitzpatrick was forced to leave after being arrested and convicted of receiving a bribe. Jacobson was elected in his own right in 1927, 1929 and 1931. He was soundly defeated by Darwin William Tate in the June 1933 general election, with 7,823 votes against Tate's 14,043.

== Vice crusader ==
Jacobson was known as a "vice crusader." It was said that Jacobson had earned the enmity of a local racketeer, Albert Marco, by refusing an offer of $25,000 to abandon his investigation of crime. "The fearless Jacobson not only declined, but also informed the federal government of Marco's activities, which led officials to fine him $250,000 for tax evasion," Cecelia Rasmussen, a reporter who specialized in historical subjects, wrote for the Los Angeles Times some seven decades later. According to a history of the Los Angeles Police Department, Jacobson was "among the first of a long list of critics of the LAPD to be targeted in a new, greatly expanded definition of the enemy. No longer were they just Reds, radicals, and union organizers. Now they'd also become good, mainstream reformers who were critical of the LAPD and City Hall."

Jacobson was arrested on August 5, 1927, in the home of a woman at 4372 Beagle Street, El Sereno, who said she was seeking his aid in fighting an assessment for paving her street. Four policemen found him in the bedroom with the woman, later identified as Callie Grimes. Within the next few days he claimed he had been framed and that glasses of liquor had been planted in the home for the arresting officers to find. He said he did not drink alcohol. Grimes, whom Jacobson knew under the alias Helen Ferguson, was in fact the sister-in-law of vice detective Frank Cox. The next week, a meeting at the Gates Street School attracted more than a thousand supporters of Jacobson, who had been charged with entering a room for immoral purposes.

At trial, Jacobson admitted to having an "immoral interest" in Grimes, but denied ever acting upon it. He said he refused an offer of a drink, the lights went out and then somebody hit him on the head, rendering him unconscious. The jury was unable to reach a verdict, and the case was dropped. Later, it was determined that Grimes had been given $2,500 by Marco, and promised a $100-a-month stipend "to get Jacobson to disrobe in her bedroom". Rasmussen wrote that as "Marco's empire began to crumble. During a brawl at Ships Cafe, a boat-shaped eatery and speak-easy on the Venice Pier, Marco shot and seriously wounded another patron. Stuck in jail, Marco was unable to make his monthly payments to Grimes...[who] blew the whistle in 1929, admitting she helped frame Jacobson.

Marco and another racketeer, Charlie Crawford, were charged along with Grimes and several police officers with conspiracy to frame the councilman. The results were more hung juries and the cases were discontinued.

Jacobson was one of the six council members who, in July 1931, lost a vote to appeal a judge's decision ordering an end to racial restrictions in city-operated swimming pools. The pools had previously been restricted by race to certain days or hours.

Preceded by Joseph F. Fitzpatrick	Los Angeles City Council; 13th District; 1925–33	Succeeded by Darwin William Tate
