= Clare Vivier =

American fashion designer

- Born: Clare Guerrero; Marion, Indiana, U.S.
- Education: University of San Francisco (BA in English)
- Occupation: Fashion designer
- Years active: 2008–present
- Notable work: Designs for Anthropologie, InStyle, collaborations with Garrett Leight, Melissa McCarthy, Adam Scott, and Mike D
- Spouse: Thierry Vivier
- Children: 1
- Awards: Member of the Council of Fashion Designers of America (CFDA)

Clare Vivier (née Guerrero) is an American fashion designer and a member of the Council of Fashion Designers of America (CFDA). In 2008, she launched her namesake brand, which sells women’s handbags, accessories, and apparel. Her company is headquartered in Los Angeles, California, where all of her products are both designed and manufactured locally.

== Early life ==
Vivier was born in Marion, Indiana. She is of Mexican/Irish descent and was raised in St. Paul, Minnesota. She attended the University of San Francisco from 1989-1994 where she studied English. In 2002, Clare married French journalist Thierry Vivier, with whom she has one offspring.

== Business ==
Vivier has designed products for Anthropologie, InStyle, Garrett Leight, actress Melissa McCarthy, actor Adam Scott, The Hundreds, and a line of men's accessories designed with Beastie Boys' member Mike D for Australian magazine Monster Children.

Vivier’s first store opened in Silverlake, California in 2012, and the second store opened under the company's new name, Clare V., in Manhattan in October 2013. The designer’s third store opened in Santa Monica in November 2014, and the fourth store opened in West Hollywood in March 2015. Clare V. has additional storefronts in California's Lido Village and Hayes Valley, Cobble Hill, NY, and Chicago.

Vivier's celebrity fan base includes Katie Holmes, Jessica Alba, Sophia Bush, and Rashida Jones, among others.

In 2012, Vivier's company, Clare V., received an initial investment from Bedrock Manufacturing Co. and Steven Alan.
