= Grace Simons =

Los Angeles civic activist (1901–1985)

- Born: 1901
- Died: 1985 (aged 83–84)
- Other name: Grace Simons Glass

Grace E. Simons was an activist who lived in Los Angeles and is known for her work in preserving Elysian Park as open space.

== Biography ==
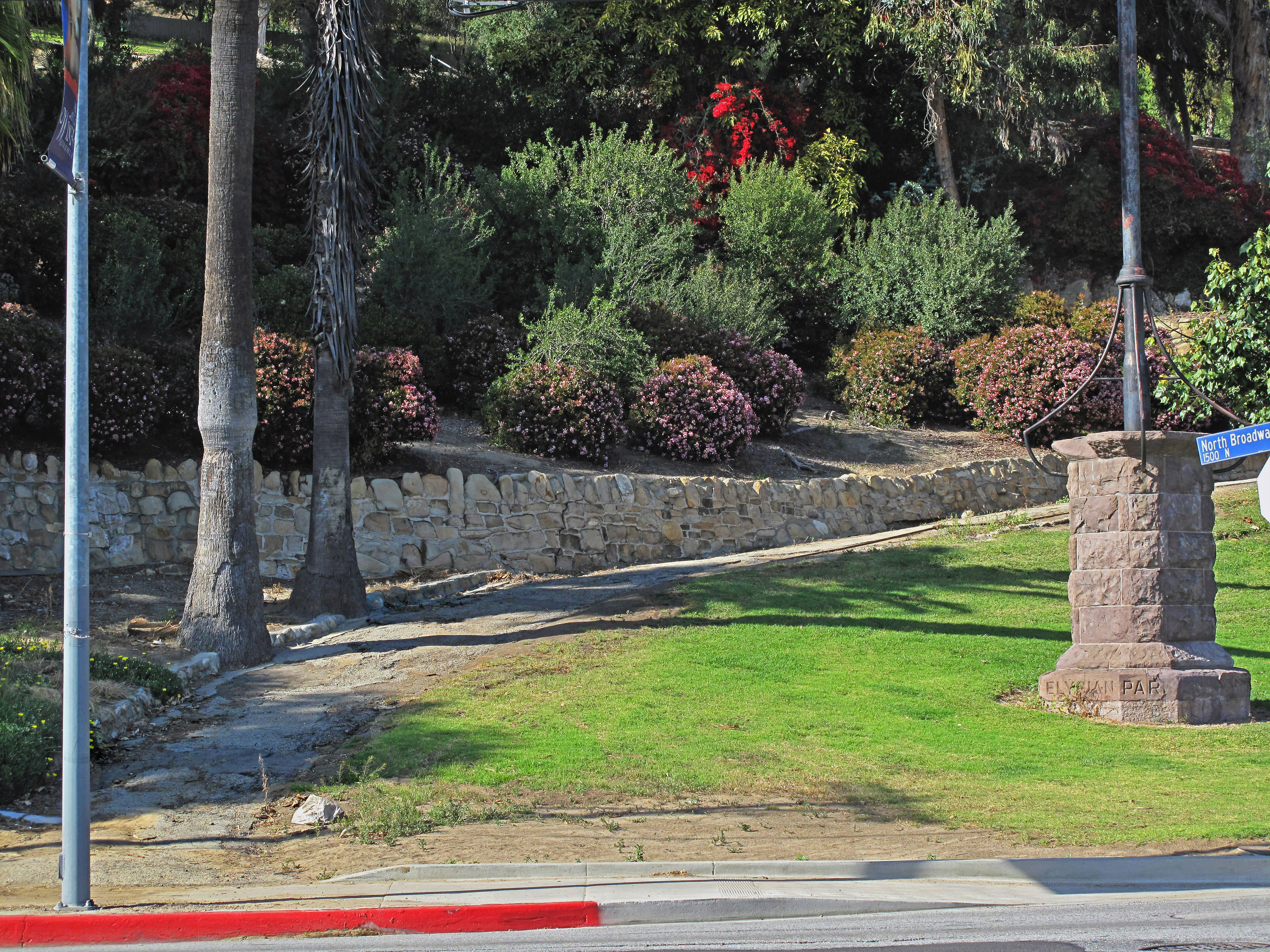
Entrance to Elysian Park, a park in Los Angeles that Simons worked to retain as open space

Simons was born in 1901 and grew up in Chicago. In 1925 she moved to China where she met her sister, the journalist Rayna Prohme.She left Beijing in 1926 to travel, and then married Wilbur Burton on July 9, 1928 in Atlanta, Georgia. Simons and Burton returned to China, this time to Shanghai where Simons first worked in a bank, and then the news agency Agence Havas. Simons returned to the United States in 1937 and married Frank Glass, a journalist she had met in China.

Simons moved to California in 1939, where she would work as a writer and as the executive editor of the California Eagle, an African American newspaper in Los Angeles, for fourteen years. While working at the California Eagle, Simons interacted with multiple people including Martin Luther King Jr., the concert artist Khalil Nimini Ben Bezaleel, and Robert Farrell. Abie Robinson, a reporter at the California Eagle, said that during a 1963 press conference Malcolm X called Simons the best journalist he knew.

In 1965 Simons started The Citizens Committee to Save Elysian Park. She used multiple means to convince people to preserve the park, even asking people to send leaves to the city council. She gathered information to oppose the plan to make the area into a convention center, and ultimately went to court to prevent drilling for oil in the park, turning parts of the park into a parking lot, a day care center, and other uses over a multi-year period. She was unsuccessful in preventing an expansion of the police academy.

Simons died in 1985, and later that year the city of Los Angeles named the community center the "Grace E. Simons Lodge" in recognition of her work to save the park.

== Awards and honors ==
In 1959 she was recognized as the best editor for Negro newspapers in Los Angeles. She received an "Award of Exception Distinction" from Governor Pat Brown in 1967 for her work in preserving Elysian Park. The Sierra Club in 1971, and the Feinstone Environmental Awards, in 1979, recognized her for the work she did to preserve Elysian Park. In 1993, after her death, the sculptor Peter Shire started a memorial sculpture that sits in Elysian Park and honors Simons and her husband Frank Glass.
