= Elysian Park =

Park in Los Angeles County, California, United States

Coordinates: 34.083°N 118.238°W

Elysian Park is one of the largest parks in Los Angeles, California, United States, at 600 acres (240 ha). Most of Elysian Park is located in the neighborhood of the same name, but a small portion of the park is in Echo Park.

The park was created by city ordinance on April 5, 1886. City engineer George Hansen sponsored the ordinance. The land was considered "worthless" at the time and only a few other parks existed within the Los Angeles city limits. For some time the land sat unimproved, but eventually roads, trails, and landscaping was added.

Parts of Elysian Park were swapped for other lands held by the Los Angeles Dodgers when Dodger Stadium was built.

== Notable features ==
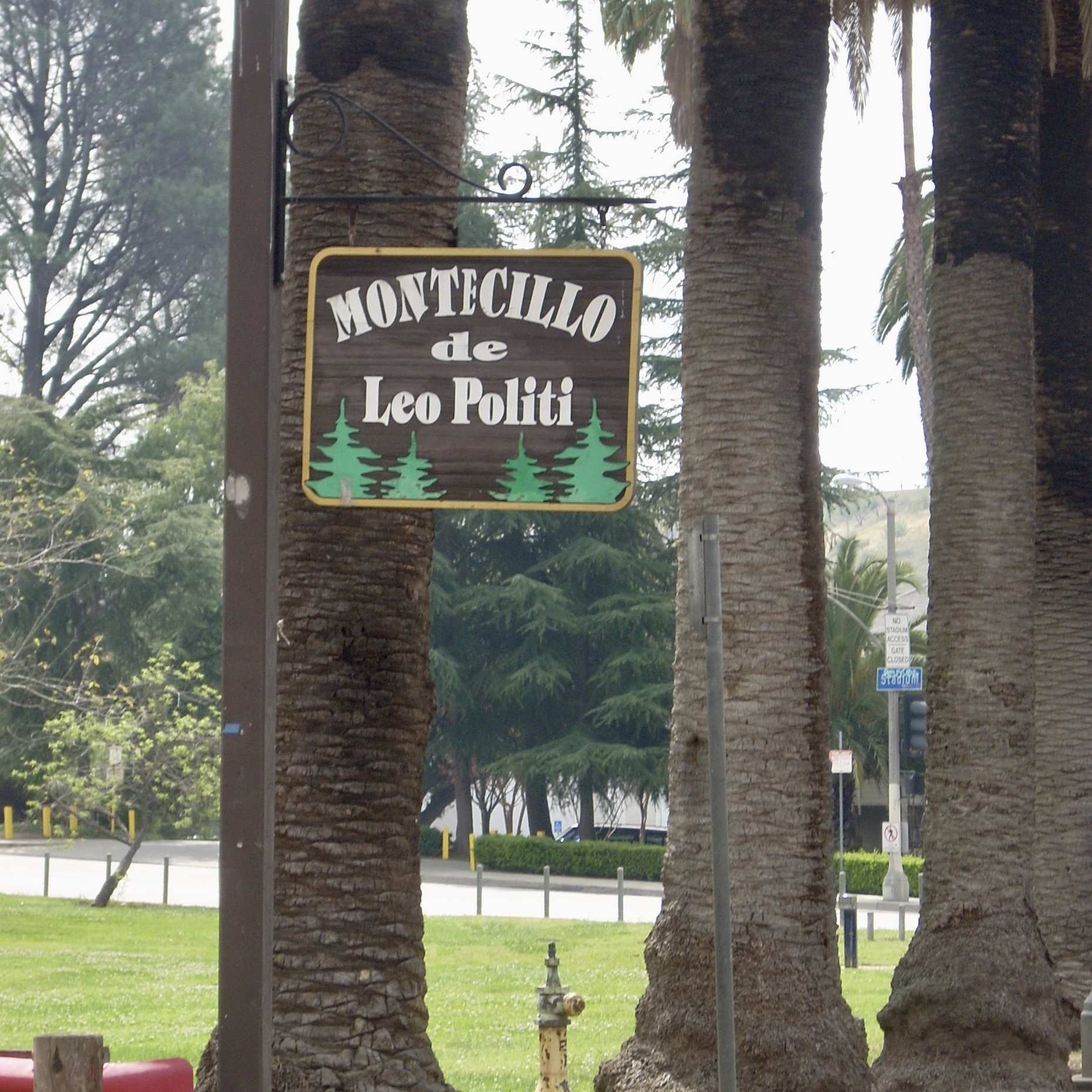
Montecillo de Leo Politi, Elysian Park, Los Angeles

Angels Point is a small hill in Elysian Park overlooking Dodger Stadium and the Downtown Los Angeles skyline. Atop the hill is a large metal sculpture art installation by local artist Peter Shire of the 1980s postmodern Memphis Group.

Chavez Ravine Arboretum opened in 1893 and contains more than 100 varieties of trees from around the world, including what are believed to be the oldest and largest Cape chestnut, kauri, and Tipu trees in the United States.

Grace E. Simons Lodge is an event space with waterfalls and reception rooms. It is named after the activist who stopped the construction of a convention center on the park grounds.

Marion Harlow Memorial Grove is a small tree and plant grove along the Elysian Park hiking trail.

The Avenue of the Palms was planted around 1895.

A section of the park called Radio Hill, beneath a radio tower, used to have a native plant garden and spice and herb gardens, but fell into an unmaintained state. As of 2021, advocates were seeking to revitalize the Radio Hill area with new trails and a dog park.

In November 2025, Project Monarch L.A. volunteers built a monarch butterfly habitat in the park to help with dwindling western monarch population in California.

== History ==
What is now Elysian Park was part of the original Spanish land grant for the Pueblo of Los Angeles.

The First Love-in started before dawn. The Los Angeles Free Press promoted the event. 15,000 people crowded in a natural amphitheater in Elysian Park, and listened to the psychedelic rock bands Strawberry Alarm Clock, The Peanut Butter Conspiracy, Clear Light, and the Flamin' Groovies.
