= Ransom M. Callicott =

American politician

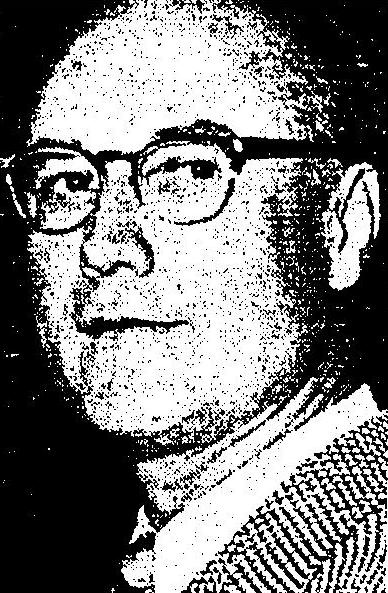
- Callicott in 1953

Member of the Los Angeles City Council from the 12th district
- In office July 1, 1955 – November 14, 1962
- Preceded by: Harriett Davenport
- Succeeded by: John P. Cassidy

Personal details
- Born: July 12, 1895 Saint Louis, Missouri
- Died: November 14, 1962 (aged 67) Los Angeles, California
- Party: Republican
- Spouses: Anne Kennedy (div. 1939) Alice Callicott (m. 1952)
- Occupation: Politician

Ransom M. Callicott (July 12, 1895 – November 14, 1962) was president of the National Restaurant Association, co-founder of Meals for Millions and a member of the Los Angeles, California, City Council from 1955 until his death. He was one of the doubters of the proposal to bring the baseball Dodgers from Brooklyn and install them in a new stadium in Chavez Ravine, insisting upon carefully examining the plans for the stadium before it was built.

== Biography ==
Callicott came to Los Angeles from Saint Louis, Missouri, in 1919 and began his career in the restaurant business as a busboy for the Boos Brothers restaurant chain. In 1931 he joined Clifford E. Clinton in the operation of Clifton's Cafeteria and in 1932 became Clinton's partner. He was a food consultant to the government in World War II, touring military camps and recommending diets for service personnel. He was a co-founder with Clinton of Meals for Millions, which packaged and distributed a high-protein product called MPF, or multipurpose food, to fight hunger. Other activities included director of the Welfare Foundation of Los Angeles and president of the Trojan Club—the only president to that date who had not attended the University of Southern California.

Callicott and his first wife, Anne Kennedy, divorced in 1939. He married again, to Alice Callicott, in 1952, and they lived at 201 South Occidental Boulevard.

Callicott, then 62, first suffered a heart ailment in April 1959 in Washington, D.C., as he accompanied Mayor Norris Poulson and Councilman James C. Corman in a bid to bring the 1960 Republican National Convention to Los Angeles; he was treated at Georgetown University Hospital. He died of a heart attack three years later in his home at 353 South Lafayette Park Place on November 14, 1962, leaving three young children, Bryan, Bret and Charles Edward, and a daughter by his first marriage, Mary Rose Brown. He was buried in Forest Lawn Memorial Park, Glendale.

== Business ==
As chairman of the Southern California Restaurant Association (1947–50), Callicott went to Washington, D.C., in February 1949 to lobby against a proposal to add restaurants to the federal wages and hours law. He said: "If it is passed, our industry would be faced with a 40-hour week. This would mean that unions would demand the same wages for 40 hours that now are paid for the prevailing 48 hours." He forecast higher prices, failing restaurants and unemployment if the bill were passed.

The association was host to the Pacific Coast Regional Restaurant Convention and Exposition in August 1948, with Callicott as speaker. He also planned a trip to the capital in May 1951 to fight new price ceiling rules on meat shipped from Denver, Colorado. When he returned, he urged restaurateurs to work against the Office of Price Stabilization rules or to eliminate meat entirely from their menus.

In 1949 he was president of the National Restaurant Association.

== Public service ==
=== Commissions ===
Before his election to the council, Callicott was a member of the city's Civil Service Commission. As a commissioner, he urged overhaul of the 1925 city charter, which he called a "125,000-word spider web of entangling phrases in which any honest official, once caught, struggles vainly for release. The only beneficiaries of this web are the nameless spider architects who have a vested interest in chaos, conflict and controversy."

At the time of his death he was a member of the Los Angeles Coliseum Commission. As president of the commission, Callicott called for a Congressional investigation of the United States Olympic Committee in the wake of decision by that body to give support to Detroit, Michigan, for the 1968 Summer Olympics instead of Los Angeles, which had entered a bid. Speaking for the Los Angeles delegation to an Olympic Committee meeting in Chicago, which he headed, he said that the committee "likes foreign trips with all expenses paid and for that reason will consistently fail to press the bid of any United States city."

=== City Council ===
==== Elections ====
Callicott ran for the Los Angeles City Council District 12 seat in 1953, losing to incumbent Councilman Ed J. Davenport in the final by just 443 votes. After Davenport died in June 1953, Callicott was one of the 13 hopefuls interviewed by a City Council committee to replace him. He "described himself as a middle-of-the-road political thinker and said that left-wing support which was attracted to his recent campaign for City Council developed only because this element was more antagonistic to Davenport." The council decided to appoint Davenport's widow, Harriett Davenport, to the position.

In 1955, however, Harriett Davenport did not stand for election, and Callicott was elected to the 12th District seat. He was reelected for a four-year term in 1959 and did not run in 1963.

In that era, the 12th District lay west of Downtown Los Angeles, between Figueroa and Catalina streets. It was bounded roughly by Venice Boulevard on the south, Sunset Boulevard on the north, Catalina Street on the west and Figueroa Street on the east.

==== Highlights ====
Callicott was chairman of the City Council's Planning Committee when Walter O'Malley, owner of the Brooklyn Dodgers baseball team, was making plans to build a new stadium in Chavez Ravine. As such, he received detailed plans for the 52,000-seat stadium and later endorsed the idea. He said:

I'm not particularly a baseball fan, but I voted for the contract because I considered it good business for this city—and for all the cities surrounding us.

Other activities during his council service:

Oil, 1956. Despite protests from Councilwoman Rosalind Wyman and residents of Cheviot Hills, Callicott moved a successful resolution asking that the city-owned Rancho Park Golf Course be explored for oil. Oil production was later begun on the property, with royalties going to the city.

Parking, 1956. He proposed regulating the fees charged by private parking lots after he had to pay $1.60 for parking "slightly more than three hours" in the Pershing Square garage.

Pershing Square, 1957. Callicott was one of the first to recommend that the grass be removed from the Pershing Square park in Downtown Los Angeles in favor of concrete because "during a fashion show ... by the city's dress industry to keep its citizens abreast of new stylings, some 10,000 spectators were hampered by an edict ... to 'keep off the grass.' "

Zoo, 1959. Callicott was one of just five council members who, after eight hours of debate, voted against a city contract with a nonprofit called Friends of the Zoo to build and operate a World Zoo for the city of Los Angeles. The action earned him the enmity of the Los Angeles Examiner, whose publisher, Franklin S. Payne, sent him a special delivery letter, which arrived at 2 a.m., excoriating him for his vote.

Tax, 1962, The City Council rejected his bid to levy a city income tax, which he said would bring in $12 million a year.

Yorty, 1962. Callicott read a three-page statement in a City Council meeting accusing Mayor Sam Yorty of keeping the facts about civic problems from the public and maintaining a large public relations staff which was "lurking behind nearly every door and office of the City Hall." He said his statement was prompted by the mayor's accusations that the twelve council members who opposed plans for a hotel on city-owned land at Los Angeles International Airport were "puppets" for hotel and motel interests. Callicott referred to the successful recall election of Mayor Frank L. Shaw in 1938 of which he said he was one of the leaders.

Preceded by Harriett Davenport	Los Angeles City Council; 12th district 1955–62	Succeeded by John P. Cassidy
