= Patt Morrison =

American journalist

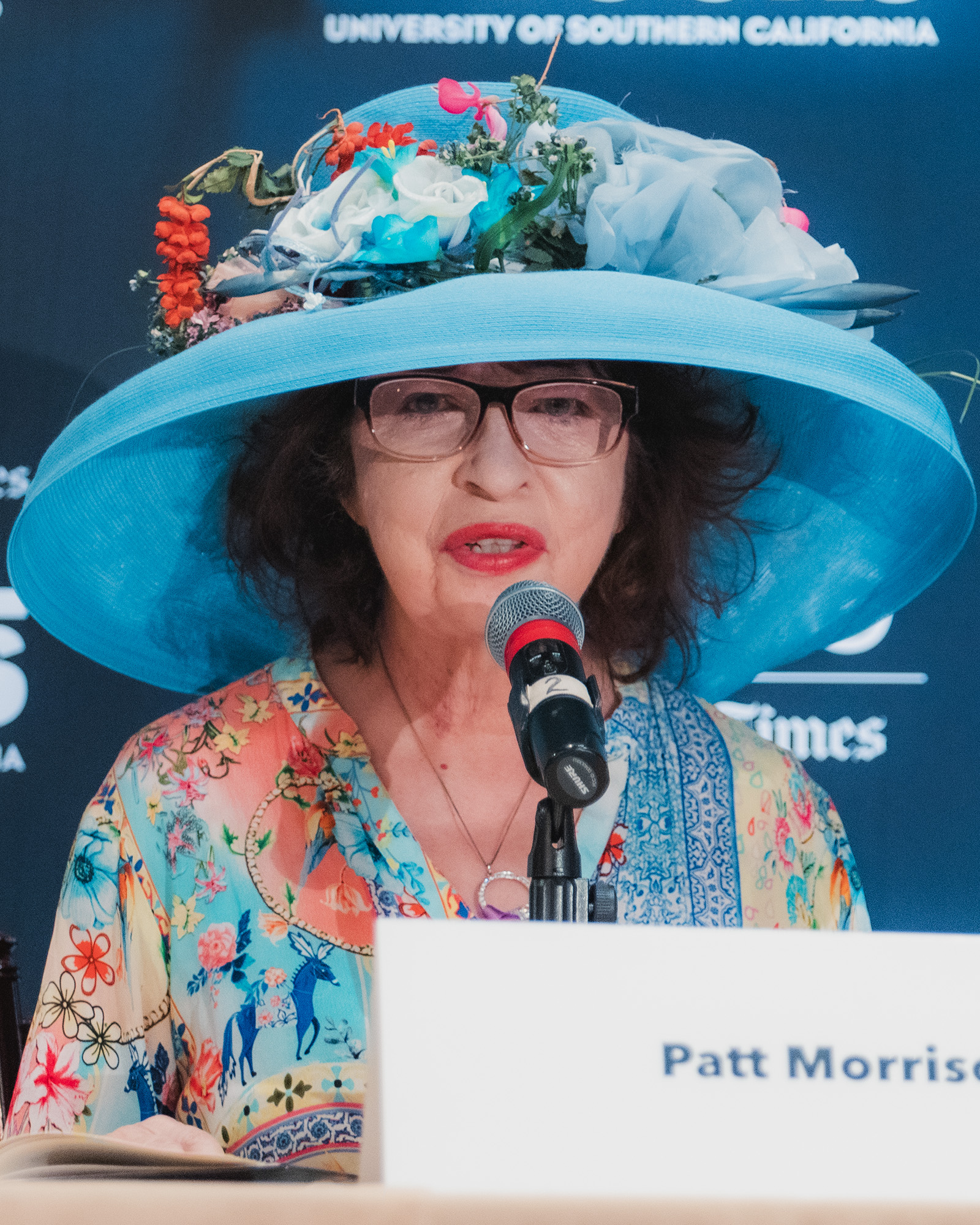
- Morrison in 2026
- Born: 1952 (age 73–74); United States
- Education: Occidental College
- Occupations: Journalist, author
- Notable credit(s): NPR 'Patt Morrison' program, PBS 'Life & Times' show, L.A. Times 'Patt Morrison Asks' column "Rio L.A." book

Patt Morrison is a journalist, author, and radio-television personality based in Los Angeles and Southern California.

== Media ==
Morrison is a writer for the Los Angeles Times, with the weekly 'Patt Morrison Asks' column, and received the Joseph M. Quinn award in 2000 from the Los Angeles Press Club for lifetime achievement. In 2006 she began hosting the eponymous public radio program 'Patt Morrison,' a 2-hour weekday interview-talk program on NPR affiliate KPCC. Her program was dropped in August 2012. Morrison has been a frequent commentator on National Public Radio since 1994, BBC radio and TV, and The Huffington Post blog. She also founded the PBS daily local news 'Life & Times' public television program, and co-hosted it on KCET-TV from 1993 to 2001. She won six Emmys and 6 Golden Mike awards for the program. Currently, Morrison fills in as the host of KPCC's "AirTalk" when the show's regular host, Larry Mantle, is unable to do the show.

In 2023, the Society of Professional Journalists Greater Los Angeles chapter gave Morrison their Distinguished Journalist Award.

== Life ==
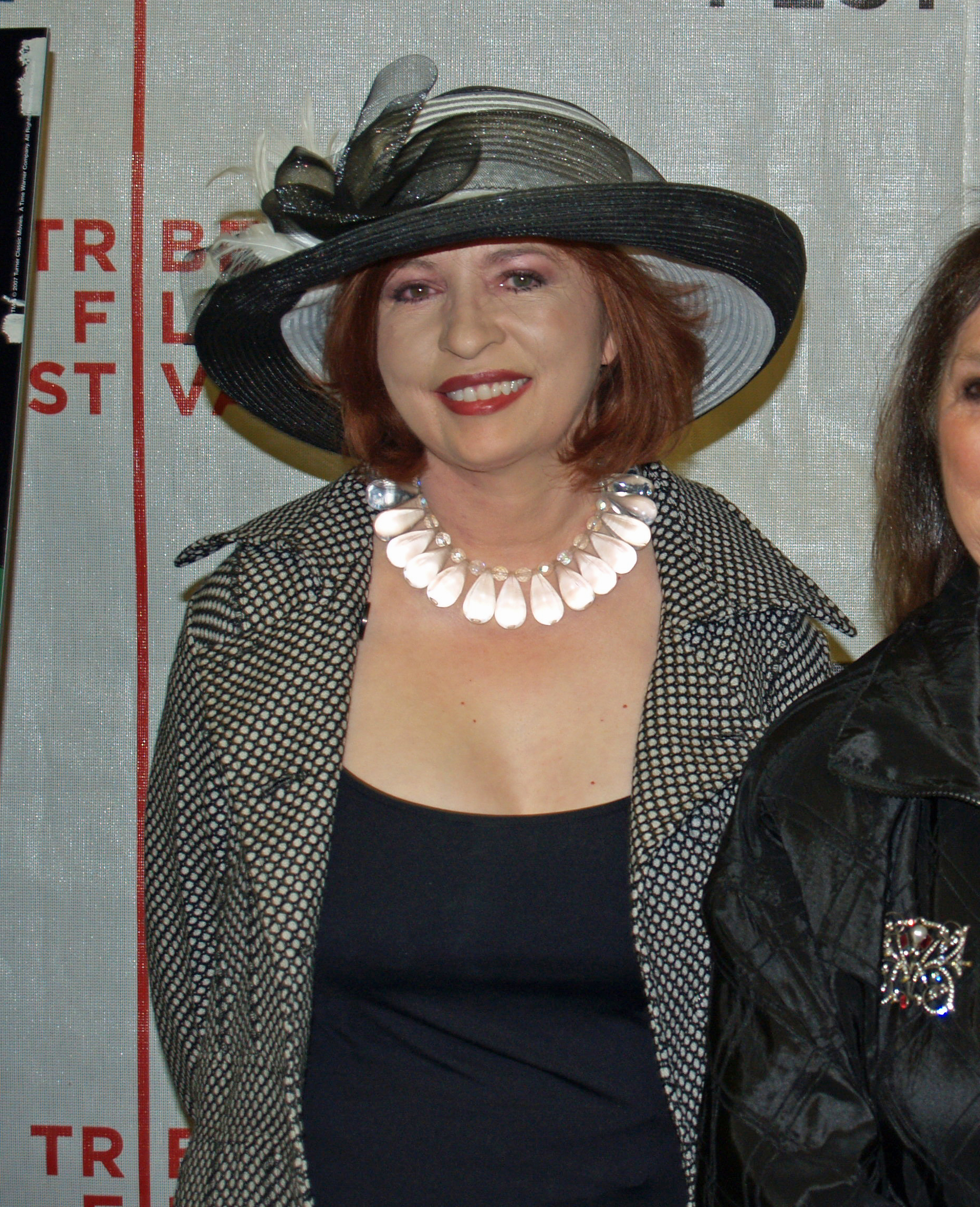
Morrison in 2007

Originally from Utica, Ohio, Morrison is a 1974 cum laude graduate of Occidental College, and was named its 'Alumnus of the year' in 1995. In 1998 she was elected to the college's board of trustees.

Her fashion trademark is wearing hats that coordinate with her clothing ensembles; she is always seen in public with one.

She identifies herself as a lacto vegetarian. Pink's Hot Dogs, a Hollywood landmark and establishment known for naming unique hot dog and topping combinations after local cultural icons, has named the vegetarian 'Patt Morrison Baja Veggie hot dog' after her.

== Author ==
Patt Morrison is a fiction and non-fiction author, and in addition to numerous magazine articles has written:

- Rio L.A., Tales from the Los Angeles River - a book with photographer Mark LaMonica. "The reality and spirit of the Los Angeles River, a concrete masterpiece of clandestine beauty that stretches from the mountains to the mouth of Long Beach Harbor."
- "Morocco Junction 90210," a story in the book Los Angeles Noir - "a collection of 17 stories about the shadow side of the 'City of Angels'."
- Don’t Stop the Presses!: Truth, Justice and the American Newspaper (ISBN 1626400431) 2018
