= Ernest E. Debs =

American politician

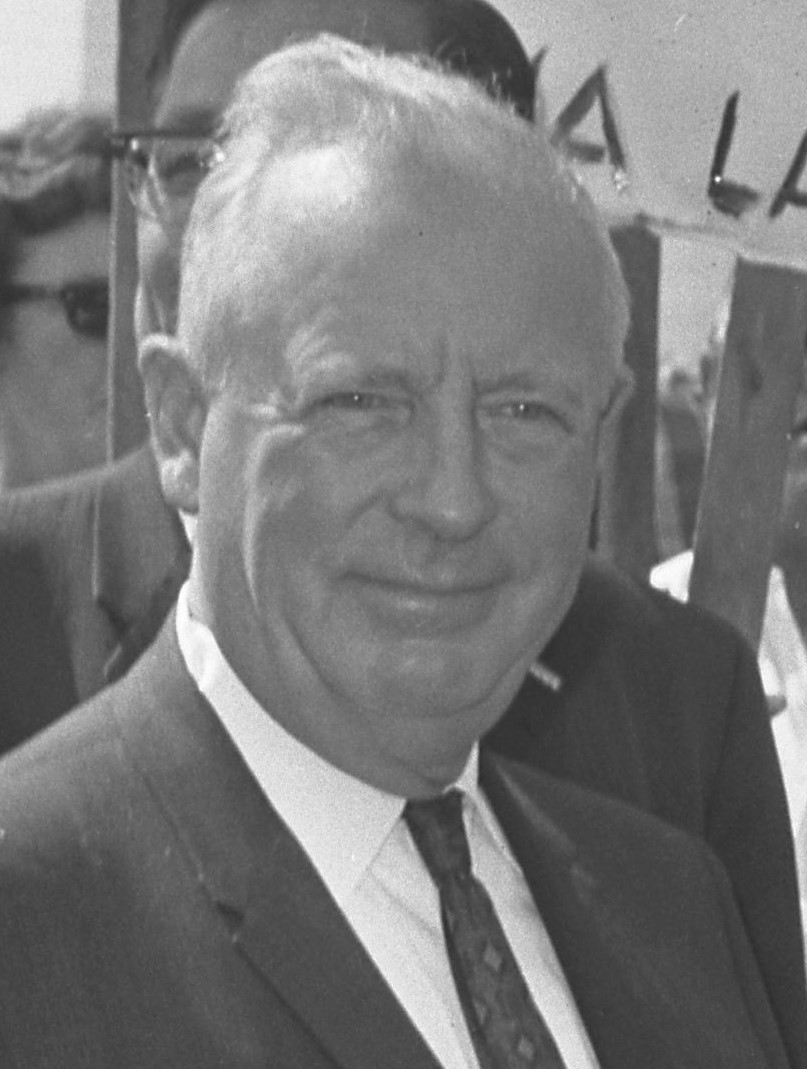
- Debs in 1966

Chair of Los Angeles County
- In office December 6, 1960 – December 4, 1962
- Preceded by: Frank G. Bonelli
- Succeeded by: Warren M. Dorn
- In office December 3, 1968 – December 8, 1970
- Preceded by: Frank G. Bonelli
- Succeeded by: Warren M. Dorn

Member of the Los Angeles County Board of Supervisors for the 3rd district
- In office December 1, 1958 – December 1, 1974
- Preceded by: John Anson Ford
- Succeeded by: Edmund D. Edelman

Member of the Los Angeles City Council from the 13th district
- In office July 1, 1947 – December 1, 1958
- Preceded by: John R. Roden
- Succeeded by: James Harvey Brown

Member of the California State Assembly from the 56th district
- In office January 4, 1943 – June 30, 1947
- Preceded by: Norris Poulson
- Succeeded by: Glenard P. Lipscomb

Personal details
- Born: Ernest Eugene Debs; February 7, 1904 Toledo, Ohio
- Died: March 17, 2002 (aged 98) Indian Wells, California
- Party: Democratic
- Other political affiliations: Liberty (1932)
- Spouse: Lorene Marsh Robertson

Ernest Eugene Debs (February 7, 1904 – March 17, 2002) was an American politician. He was a California State Assembly member from 1942 to 1947, a Los Angeles city councilman from 1947 to 1958 and a member of the Los Angeles County Board of Supervisors from 1958 to 1974.

== Biography ==
Debs was born in Toledo, Ohio, on February 7, 1904, and came to California in a box car when he was 20 to work in the motion picture industry as a dancer. He was also a salesman. "He had no college education and prided himself on being a self-made man," the Los Angeles Times reported in his obituary. Debs married Lorene Marsh Robertson of Placerville, California, in 1944; they had two adopted children, David and Catherine Clare. They lived at 2416 McCready Avenue in the Silver Lake district.

He was not related to Eugene V. Debs, the labor leader and Socialist candidate for president. He said in 1947:

We're not even remotely related. I am often asked the question, however, and generally it brings up the subject of my party affiliations and general philosophy of government. Well, I guess I'd be called a conservative Democrat. I was elected to the Assembly on both the Republican and Democratic tickets. Definitely I'm against radicals and Communists. At the same time I think the little fellow should get a square deal—I'm for that, too.

Debs, a resident of Indian Wells, Riverside County, at the time, died at the age of 98 on March 17, 2002. He was survived by his wife, Betty Debs; and children David Debs, Candi Debs, Stan Grant, Lonnie Gordon and Nancy Martel. A memorial service was held in the Los Angeles County Hall of Administration.

== Public service ==
=== Congress ===
Debs ran unsuccessfully for the Congressional seat in the 17th District in 1932. Nineteen years later, in the context of a heated City Council reelection campaign, he was accused by Walter C. Smith, an executive with Lockheed Aircraft, of having registered as a Socialist in both 1930 and 1931 and to have favored "government ownership of public utilities" during the 1932 campaign.

=== State Assembly ===
Debs gave up show business to become a sergeant-at-arms in the State Assembly, and in 1942 he won election to the Assembly in the 56th District. While in the State Assembly, he authored the bill establishing the California State University at Los Angeles campus.

=== City Council ===
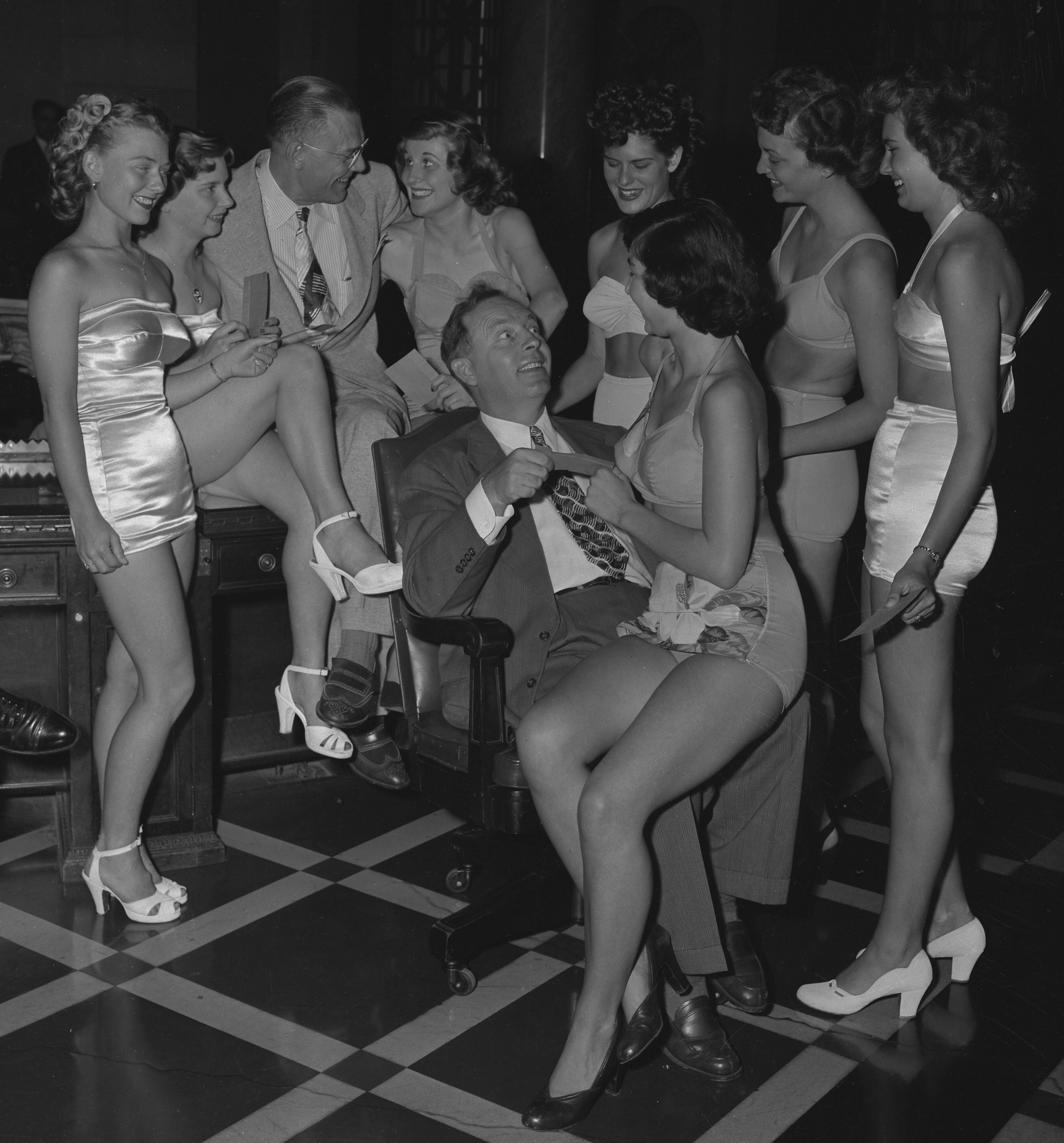
Debs (center) and L. E. Timberlake surrounded by Sennett Bathing Beauties, 1949

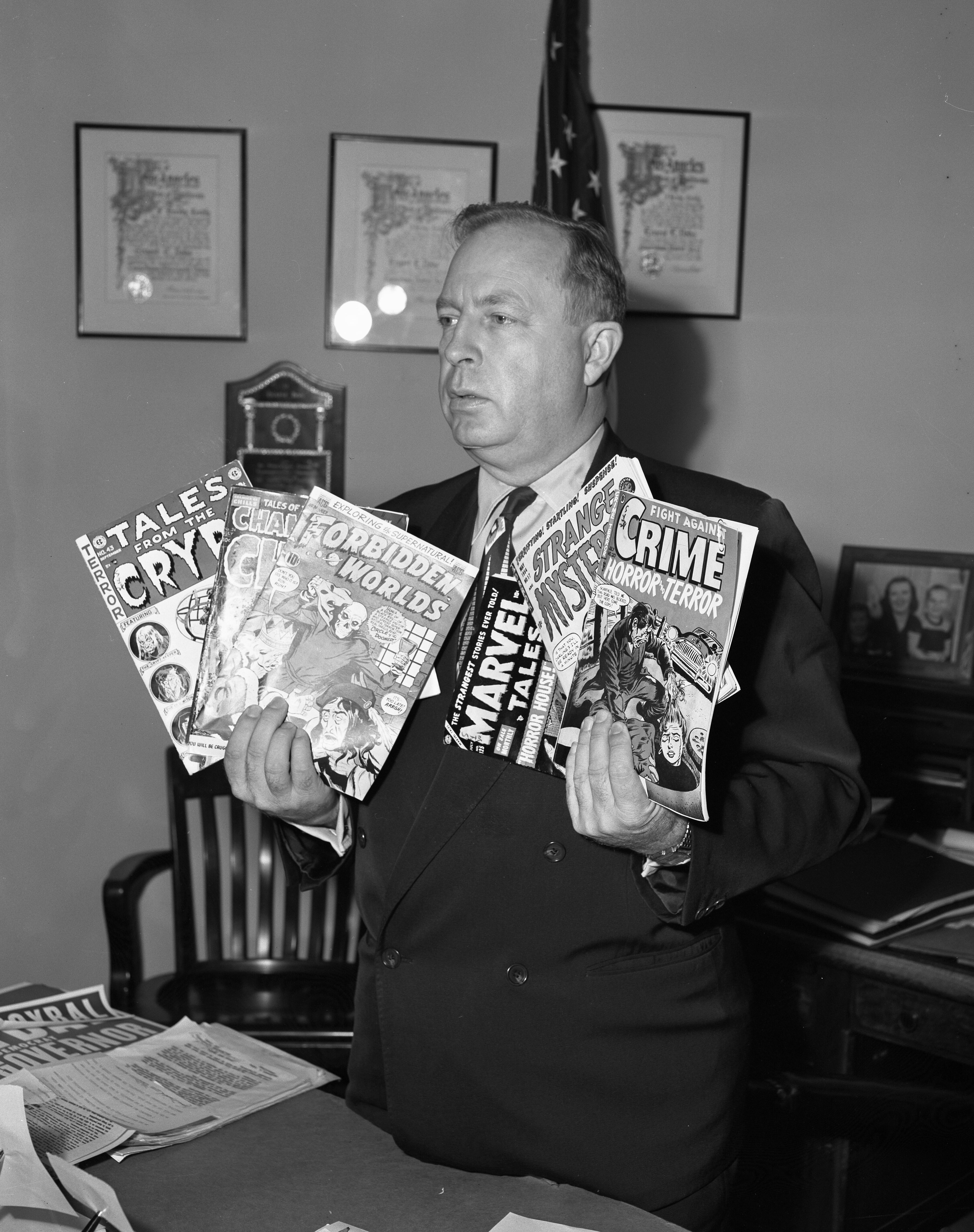
Debs displaying horror and crime comic books purchased in his district, 1954

==== Elections ====
Debs first ran for the Los Angeles City Council District 8 seat in the "extreme southwest" of the city in 1931, but came in fourth in a field of eight candidates: Incumbent Evan Lewis was the winner. At that time, according to Walter C. Smith, he was registered in the Liberty Party. In 1947 he ran for the District 13 seat in an area that extended westward to Vermont Avenue and south to Valley Boulevard; he beat incumbent John R. Roden in the runoff vote. He had no opponent in 1949, and he won reelection in the 1951 and 1953 primaries. He had no opponent in 1957.

==== Positions ====
Incinerator, 1947. After an explosion at the controversial city incinerator at Avenue 21 and Lacy Street, Debs pushed through a resolution calling for an investigation into the circumstances of letting the contract.

Psychiatrist, 1949. Debs was in the forefront of a City Council move against J. Paul de River, the only Los Angeles Police Department psychiatrist at the time, whose activities during the Black Dahlia murder case were said to have resulted in the arrest of two men later released for lack of evidence. He criticized de River for having written a "luridly illustrated" book on criminal sex cases, using Police Department files as source material. "The book is filthy and shocking," said Debs, "an obvious attempt to pander to depraved tastes."

Heaters, 1957. He called for the investigation of what he said were 3,000 to 4,000 unvented gas heaters installed in the city schools.

=== Board of Supervisors ===
Debs was elected to the county Board of Supervisors in 1958, representing the 3rd District. As a county supervisor, he chaired 13 major departments and served on many committees.

During the 1960s, Debs was an implacable foe of the youth counterculture movement centered on the county-administered Sunset Strip. Working through the Sheriff's office, he forced the closure of several coffeehouses and rock-and-roll venues, such as Pandora's Box. His crackdown on nightlife led to the 1966 Sunset Strip riot. Debs ardently backed the construction of the Laurel Canyon Freeway and Beverly Hills Freeway and sought to turn the Sunset Strip into a new office district. With the cancellation of both freeway projects and competition from the nearby and newly built Century City as a premium office market, Debs' plans for the Strip were only partly realized.

He appointed the final three members to the nine-member Los Angeles County Civil Defense and Disaster Commission during the nuclear crisis in the early 1960s: They were Disaster Services co-coordinator Roy D. Hoover, Sheriff Peter J. Pitchess, and businessman Louis Lesser.

== Legacy ==
Two public parks bear the Debs name:

1. Ernest E. Debs Regional Park — in the western San Rafael Hills above the Arroyo Seco, in the Montecito Heights neighborhood of central-northeast Los Angeles.
2. Ernest Debs Park — in Bell (southeastern L.A. County).

Preceded by John R. Roden	Los Angeles City Council; 13th District; 1947–1958	Succeeded by James Harvey Brown
Preceded by John Anson Ford	Los Angeles County Board of Supervisors; 3rd District; 1958–1974	Succeeded by Edmund D. Edelman
Preceded by Frank G. Bonelli	Chair of Los Angeles County; 1960 –1962; 1968 – 1970	Succeeded by Warren M. Dorn
