= Robert J. Stevenson =

American politician and actor (1915–1975)

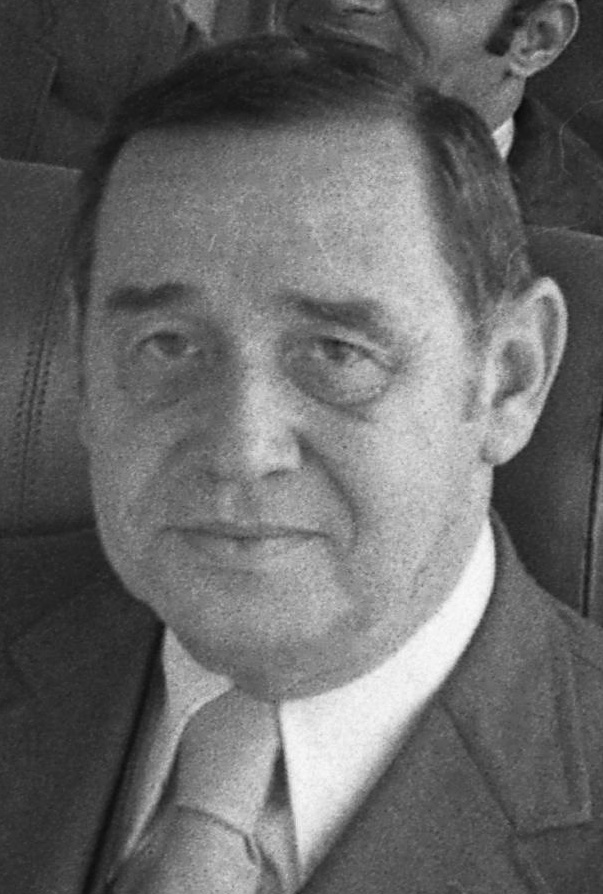
- Stevenson in 1972

President pro tempore of the Los Angeles City Council
- In office July 1, 1973 – June 30, 1975
- Preceded by: Billy G. Mills
- Succeeded by: John Ferraro

Member of the Los Angeles City Council from the 13th district
- In office July 1, 1969 – March 4, 1975
- Preceded by: Paul H. Lamport
- Succeeded by: Peggy Stevenson

Personal details
- Born: Robert J. Stevenson; October 10, 1915 Harrisburg, Pennsylvania, U.S.
- Died: March 4, 1975 (aged 59) Northridge, Los Angeles, U.S.
- Party: Democratic
- Spouse: Peggy Stevenson
- Occupation: Politician; actor

Robert J. Stevenson (October 10, 1915 – March 4, 1975) was an American politician and former actor who served on the Los Angeles City Council for the District 13 from 1969 to 1975. As a film and television actor, Stevenson had approximately 133 credits. After his death in 1975, his wife, Peggy Stevenson, was elected to the seat. They were the second husband and wife to serve consecutive terms on the Los Angeles City Council—the first having been Ed J. Davenport and Harriett Davenport between 1945 and 1955.

== Personal life and acting career ==
Stevenson was born on October 10, 1915, in Harrisburg, Pennsylvania.

Stevenson was news editor and commentator for WHN radio and newscaster for "Around the World News" on CBS Radio in New York City and also worked for CBS in Los Angeles, California. He was a staff announcer on The Jack Benny Program and a film and TV actor, with 119 credits between 1946 and 1971, including an episode of I Love Lucy.

In 1957, Stevenson was cast as Dave Weller in the episode "Deep Fraud" of John Bromfield's syndicated crime drama, Sheriff of Cochise, set in Arizona. In 1958, Stevenson had a recurring role as "Big Ed", the town bartender in the 26-episode NBC western television series, Jefferson Drum, starring Jeff Richards as a crusading Old West newspaper editor. After Jefferson Drum, Stevenson appeared in two episodes as a police lieutenant named "Ringer" in the short-lived ABC series, The Man from Blackhawk, starring Robert Rockwell as a roving insurance investigator. Stevenson subsequently appeared in other western series, including nine episodes of Richard Boone's Have Gun - Will Travel, six times on Bonanza, three times each on Gunsmoke and Rawhide, and twice each on Tales of Wells Fargo and The Virginian. He also had minor roles in two episodes of CBS's The Twilight Zone.

In 1959, he played "Luke", a cowboy turned assassin out to kill General Sherman while the latter was visiting Dodge City in S1E11 "General Sherman’s March Through Dodge City" in the TV Western Bat Masterson. In 1962 Stevenson (credited as Robert J. Stevenson) appeared as Torson on The Virginian in the episode titled "The Brazen Bell." He was sometimes credited as Robert Forrest, Robert Stephenson, or Bob Stevenson. In 1962 Stevenson was credited as Robert J. Stevenson on The Virginian in the episode titled "The Brazen Bell." Also in 1962 he played drunken store owner Ax Parsons in the episode “The Gallows (S7E22) of the TV Western Gunsmoke.

Stevenson served in the United States Army during World War II. His offices and memberships included president of the Nichols Canyon Association, trustee of the Buckley School, Greater Los Angeles Press Club, International Footprint Association, International Society for the Protection of Animals, American Federation of Television and Radio Artists and the Screen Actors Guild.

He and his wife Peggy had a son, Bruce, born in 1956. The family lived in the Hollywood Hills, just above Sunset Boulevard. Robert died in Northridge, California, on March 4, 1975, aged 59, after cardiac arrest, complicated by hepatitis and an infected gallbladder. He had been ill for several months and underwent surgery for multiple retinal breaks in October and November 1974 but managed to return to his city council seat in December of that year. A funeral service was held in Forest Lawn Memorial Park, Glendale, with the Reverend Frank Kelly of St. Athanasius Episcopal Church officiating.

== Elections ==
Robert Stevenson began his City Hall career as a field deputy for Councilman James Potter and later had the same job for Paul H. Lamport in the 13th District. He resigned and successfully ran for election against his old boss in 1969.

Stevenson scored reelection to the city council in 1973 by soundly defeating policeman Irving Kaspar. The conservative Kaspar criticized Stevenson's indictment and trial on charges of conspiracy and bribery in a Chinatown gambling scheme (below). Stevenson attacked Kaspar in a tabloid publication for allegedly having been "a known John Birch Society sympathizer." Kaspar went to court and got a temporary restraining order against further circulation of the campaign sheet on the grounds the statement was untrue. In the end, voters cast 27,231 ballots for Stevenson and 21,062 for Kaspar.

== Positions ==
Robert Stevenson was known as "a widely respected reformer and moderate who often served as a peacemaker between clashing colleagues." Nevertheless, he was also seen as "warring" with fellow Councilman Arthur K. Snyder, partially occasioned by Stevenson's support of redistricting of Snyder's neighboring councilmanic District 14.

Known for his "progressive voting record," Stevenson was "the innovator of a new system of council hearings," being the first councilman to hire outside counsel to conduct an investigation. Other positions:

1969. He voted against allowing churches to be established in single-family residential neighborhoods as a matter of right, stating: "I don't have the right to say arbitrarily 'you people in the neighborhood are going to get a church whether you like it or not.' "

1970. He and Council Member James B. Potter, Jr. took the lead in successfully opposing a proposed freeway (State Route 160) through Laurel Canyon that would have linked Slauson Avenue in Ladera Heights with the San Fernando Valley. They said the idea was a "scheme to bury huge areas of Hollywood, the mountains and Studio City under a blanket of concrete."

1973. Stevenson submitted an ordinance that would have required outdoor eating places along Hollywood, Ventura and Wilshire boulevards to be enclosed as a way to prevent the spread of litter.

1973. In urging the establishment of minibus routes through the Santa Monica Mountains, he and Council Member Joel Wachs disagreed with a Southern California Rapid Transit District report that the proposed routes would face safety hazards on the "steep and narrow roadways."

1974. Stevenson proposed an ordinance that would, among other things, have made job discrimination illegal against homosexuals. After his death, the City Council unanimously voted in 1975 to kill it. Police Chief Edward M. Davis was one of its more vocal critics.

== Conspiracy and bribery ==
=== Indictment and decision ===
Robert Stevenson and eight other people were indicted in February 1970 on charges of conspiracy and bribery in the asserted proposed establishment of gambling dens in Chinatown the previous year. Authorities said a multimillion-dollar-a-year operation was planned. All defendants were freed when a jury could not reach a verdict and Judge Joseph A. Sprankle Jr. declared a mistrial, acquitting Stevenson and seven of the other defendants. He said he did so reluctantly in Stevenson's case because he thought the councilman "probably knew something about what was going on," but that "the voters can take care of this in the next election."

=== Slander ===
In 1973 Stevenson filed suit against fellow City Councilman Arthur K. Snyder over Snyder's remarks about Stevenson during a radio interview concerning the bribery-conspiracy trial. Nineteen months later, a settlement ensued with Snyder making an apology but with no money changing hands.

=== Legacy ===
Stevenson Manor, a 61-unit apartment project at 1230 North Cole Avenue, Hollywood, was named for Councilman Robert Stevenson.

Preceded by Paul H. Lamport	Los Angeles City Council; 13th District; 1969–75	Succeeded by Peggy Stevenson
Preceded by Joel Wachs	President Pro Tempore of the Los Angeles City Council; 1973–75	Succeeded by Joan Milke Flores
