= John R. Roden =

American politician (1919–2008)

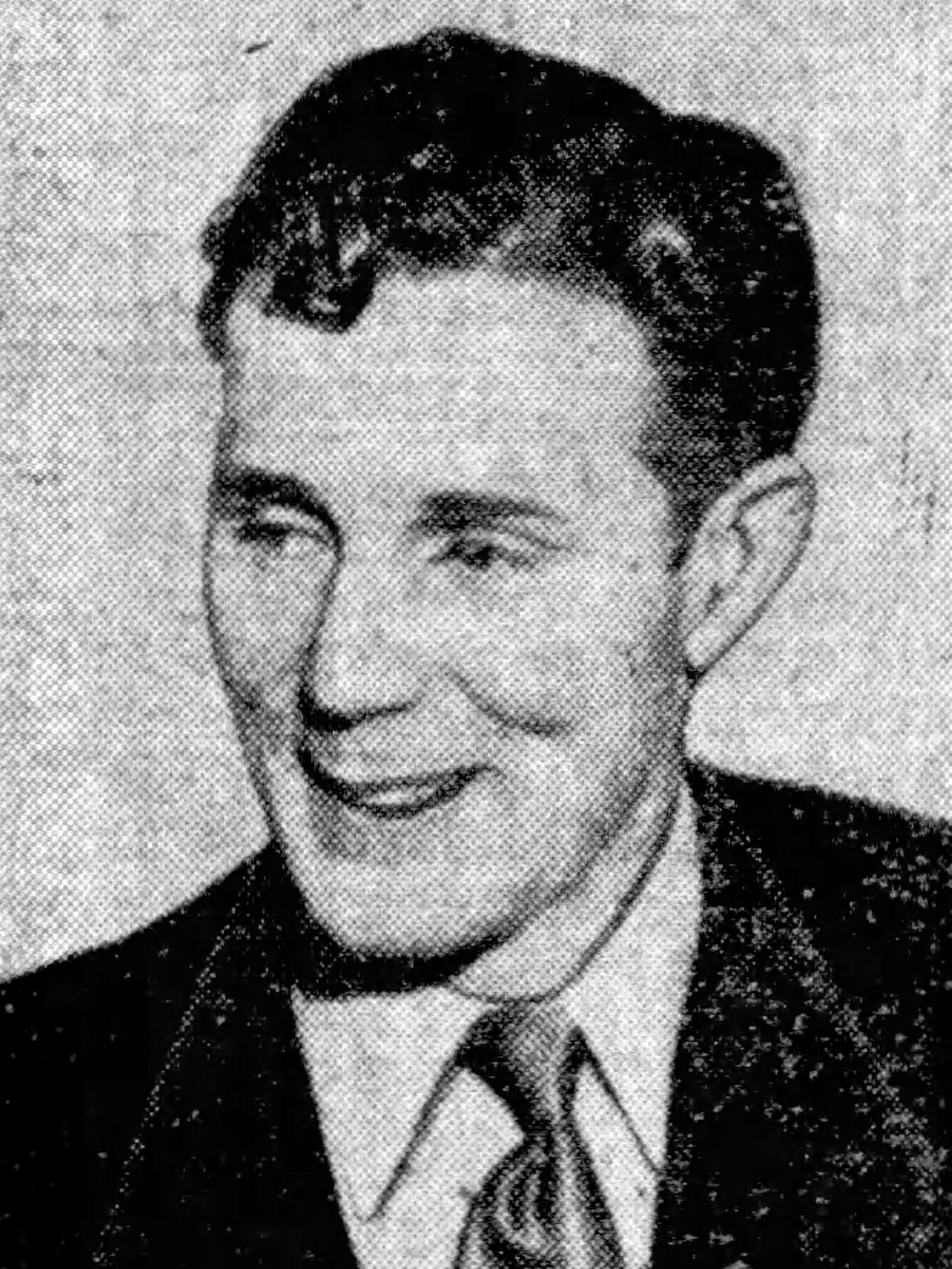
- Roden in 1946

Member of the Los Angeles City Council from the 13th district
- In office March 25, 1946 – June 30, 1947
- Preceded by: Meade McClanahan
- Succeeded by: Ernest E. Debs

Personal details
- Born: John Russel Patrick Roden; December 12, 1919 San Francisco, California, U.S.
- Died: January 28, 2008 (aged 88) Hayward, California, U.S.
- Party: Democratic
- Spouse: Francesca Nadine Romoli (m. 1946; div. 1952) Carmen Alicia Olson (m. 1953)
- Education: Los Angeles City College; University of California, Los Angeles

Military service
- Branch/service: United States Air Force (Air Transport Command)
- Years of service: 1942–1946
- Rank: Lieutenant
- Battles/wars: World War II; China Burma India theater
- Awards: Distinguished Flying Cross; Air Medal; Burma Star; China Star

John Russel Patrick Roden (December 12, 1919 – January 28, 2008) was an American politician and U.S. Army veteran who served on the Los Angeles City Council representing the 13th district from 1946 to 1947. A veteran of World War II who served with the Air Transport Command, Roden returned to Los Angeles and became the main candidate supported by the recall coalition that removed councilman Meade McClanahan.

During his brief tenure on the council he caused controversy, most notably by voting in favor of a city incinerator in Lincoln Heights, which eventually led to his defeat in the 1947 election by California State Assemblyman Ernest E. Debs.

== Early life and education ==
John Russell Patrick Roden was born on December 19, 1919, in San Francisco, California, to Ann Donovan Roden. In 1921, his mother moved them to Los Angeles and purchased a home in the Silver Lake neighborhood where he grew up. He attended local elementary and middle schools, including Immaculate Heart Middle School and Thomas Starr King Middle School, and later graduated from John Marshall High School. He attended Los Angeles City College and went on to graduate from the University of California, Los Angeles. While in middle school he was a Boy Scout and good in athletics such as baseball, track and field, and ice hockey. He also enjoyed skating and photography. After graduating, he worked as a draftsman and an aeronautical engineer.

== Military career ==
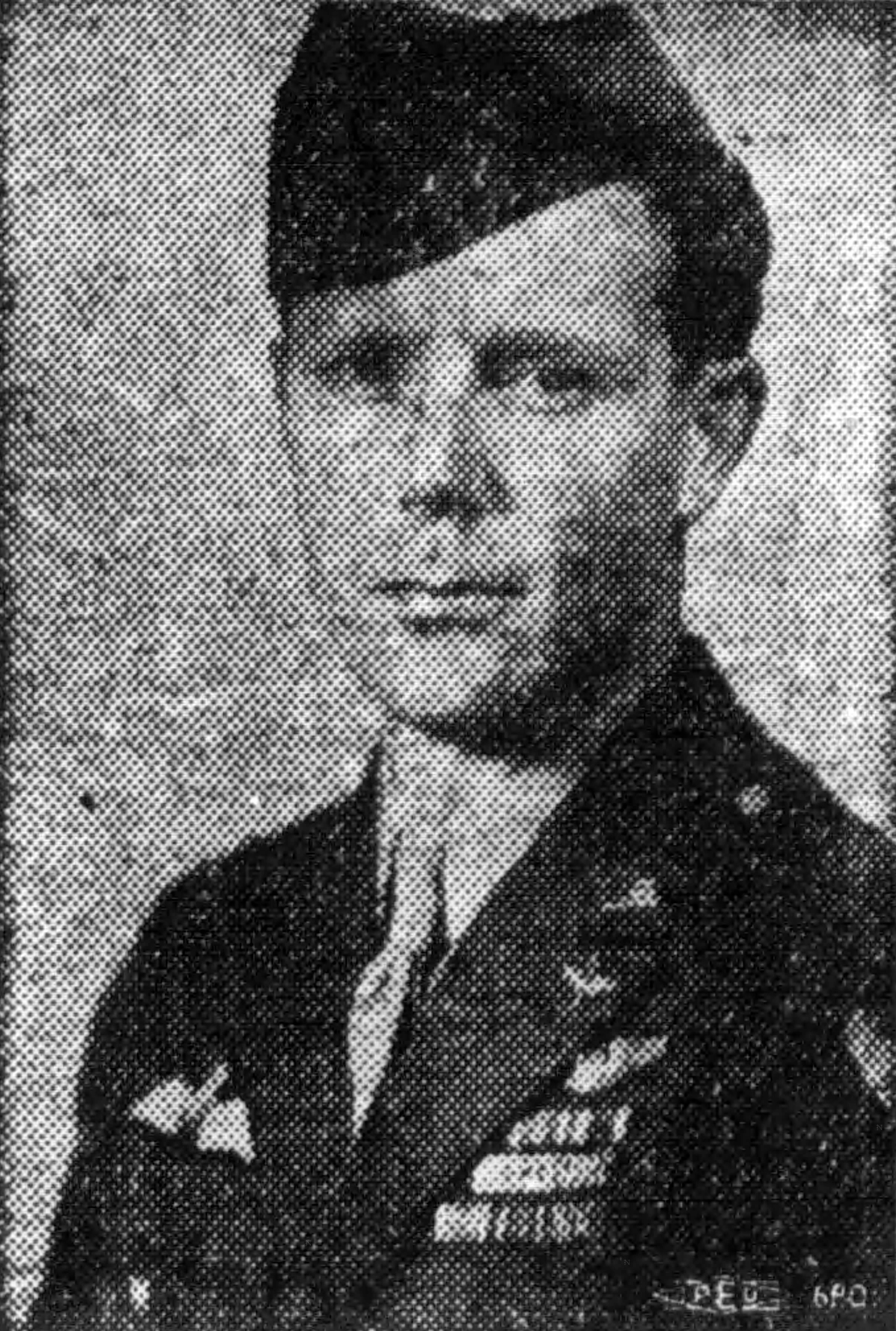
Roden in his Army uniform during his time in the United States Air Force.

Roden registered for the draft on July 1, 1941. A qualified civilian pilot before enlisting, he and 17 other pilots underwent special training with the Royal Air Force in Mesa, Arizona. Eight months later, he joined the Air Transport Command unit of the United States Air Force.

During his service, Roden flew worldwide in a Lockheed P-80 Shooting Star and held a 5-P rating, the highest available. On a flight over The Hump, he lost an engine and was forced to turn back. On two other missions, he was attacked by enemy aircraft while piloting unarmed transports, evading by descending into low cloud cover. While stationed in Kunming, China, he survived two bombing attacks, including one by the Imperial Japanese Army during a landing where he escaped his aircraft before it was destroyed within seconds. He transported the staff of Lord Mountbatten to Lower Burma. On another mission he encountered the Big Storm of January 7, 1945, which extended the flight to seven hours.

For most of his service he flew cargo missions over the Hump, carrying high‑octane gasoline and munitions. During his time in the China Burma India theater, he served as a senior navigation and briefing officer, responsible for coordinating, supervising, and administering the establishment of all routes and for pioneering new air routes. Because of his service, he was awarded the Distinguished Flying Cross, the Air Medal with two oak leaf clusters, the China Star, the Burma Star, and four battle stars. He earned the rank of Lieutenant in the Army.

== Political career ==
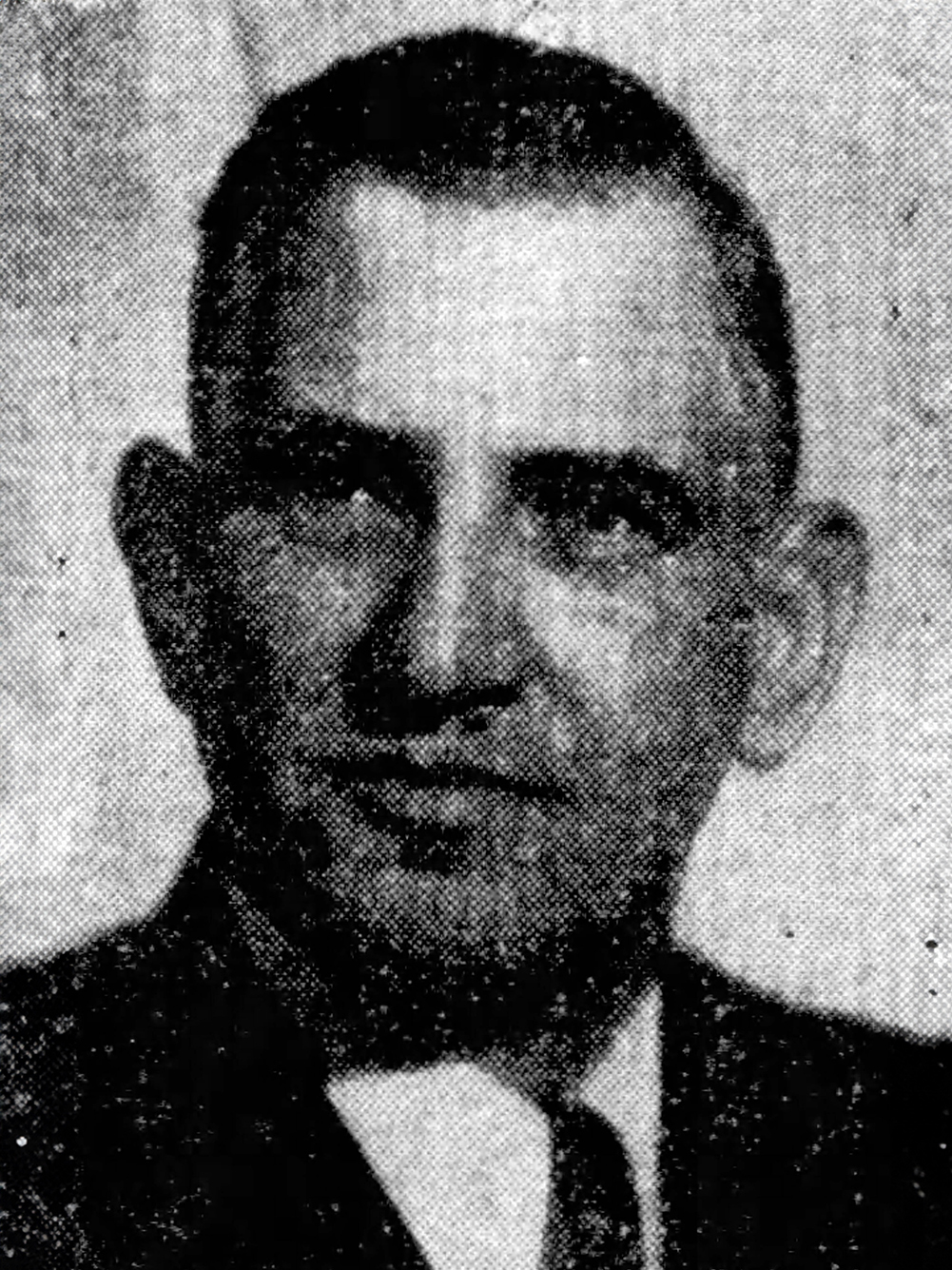
Meade McClanahan

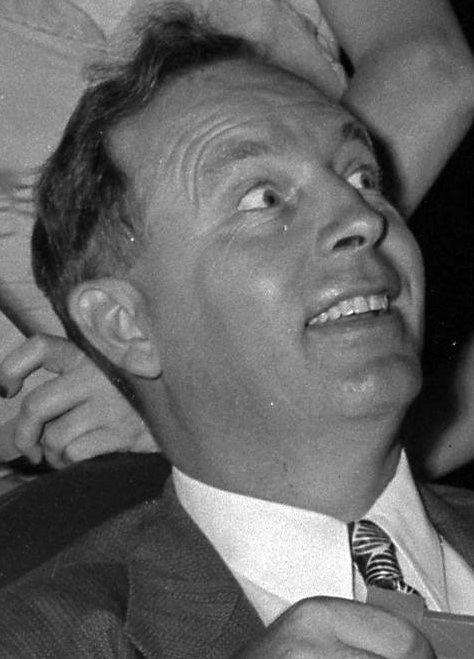
Ernest E. Debs

Roden's political career started after the recall of councilman McClanahan (left) in 1946 and ended after his defeat by Debs (right) in 1947.

=== Recall of Meade McClanahan ===
In 1946, Meade McClanahan, a Los Angeles City Councilman representing the 13th district, who had been elected the previous year to complete the term of Ned R. Healy after Healy was elected to the U.S. House of Representatives, faced a recall campaign that came from his association with Gerald L. K. Smith, a controversial far-right demagogue. Roden stated that he had been only casually interested in politics when he enlisted in the Army, but after attending the meeting where both Smith and McClanahan spoke he was displeased by their remarks.

In January 1946, petitions calling for McClanahan's recall were submitted to the Los Angeles City Clerk. After verification, the clerk certified the petitions and scheduled the recall election for March 19, 1946. Roden was one of five candidates who filed nomination papers for the recall election, but only three qualified. He received the endorsement of the recall coalition and was presented as a candidate whose image contrasted with McClanahan's allegation that the recall was driven by Communists. The recall succeeded, with Roden winning a landslide majority over McClanahan and succeeding him on the Los Angeles City Council.

=== City Council term and defeat ===
Roden was sworn in as a councilman on March 25, 1946, he was greeted at a tour by Mayor of Los Angeles Fletcher Bowron and other city officials. He was the youngest member of the City Council and the first World War II veteran elected to a Los Angeles public office.

During his tenure, Roden attracted controversy for several decisions. In October 1946, he caused public opposition by voting in favor of constructing a city incinerator in Lincoln Heights. The following month, he was the sole council member to oppose a $1,000 reward offer related to violence during a November 1946 strike by Columbia Studios film technicians. Later that year, as the strike continued, a Roden resolution calling for arbitration drew criticism from fellow councilman Ed J. Davenport of the 12th district, who accused him of showing bias in the matter. Their feud persisted the next year when Davenport introduced a resolution requesting that the council be kept informed about the progress of various bills before the Congressional Committee on Un-American Activities, prompting a public dispute between the two councilmen over the measure.

In the 1947 election, Roden faced three challengers, including Meade McClanahan, who sought to regain his seat, and Ernest E. Debs, a California State Assemblyman and former ally of the recall movement. Roden and Debs advanced to the runoff election, in which Roden was ultimately defeated by Debs. Roden's support for the proposed incinerator was a significant factor in his loss, as Debs and numerous local associations campaigned against the project.

=== Post-Council activities ===
After leaving the City Council in 1947, Roden worked as a television-manufacturing executive and later sold volumes of Encyclopædia Britannica. He attempted to run for the California State Assembly from the 56th district, a seat vacated by Ernest E. Debs after Debs defeated Roden, but was removed from the ballot by Superior Judge Frank G. Swain after filing his affidavit of candidacy shortly before midnight on September 30 instead of meeting the 5:00 p.m. filing deadline.

== Personal life ==
Roden lived in the Los Angeles neighborhood of Silver Lake. He moved there with his mother as a child and continued to reside in the neighborhood during his service on the City Council. He was a Democrat.

In May 1946, Roden announced that he would be marrying Francesca Nadine Romoli, a wine heiress, marrying her on September 28, 1946 at Our Mother of Good Counsel church. In January 1952, Romoli and Roden divorced, previously obtaining an interlocutory decree of divorce in July 1949, reconciled six months later, and separated again in February 1950. In a testimony against him, Romoli alleged that Roden had spanked her after having political disagreements.

On October 10, 1953, he married Carmen Alicia Olson, who served as director of home economics for Admiral Distributors' Northern California division, now both residing in San Francisco. Roden died on January 28, 2008 at his home in Hayward, California.

Preceded by Meade McClanahan	Los Angeles City Council; 13th District; 1946–47	Succeeded by Ernest E. Debs
