= 41.18 =

History of a loitering law

41.18, also known as Los Angeles Municipal Code, Section 41.18(d) (1963, amended 2021), is an ordinance in Los Angeles mandating by law that there will be no "sitting, lying, or sleeping, or ... storing, using, maintaining, or placing personal property in the public right-of-way."

Sec. 41.18(d) dictates the distance any person must be from places such as: utilizable driveways and loading docks; operational or utilizable buildings; any permitted event; bike lanes and bike paths; parks, schools, libraries, or otherwise designated as a "sensitive use" facility; freeway ramp, tunnel, bridge, pedestrian bridge, subway, wash, spreading ground, or active railway; or, anywhere near (1000 feet) of a facility opened after January 1, 2018, that provides shelter, safe sleeping, safe parking to houseless persons or that serves as a navigation center.

== History of the law ==
Historically, homelessness has been criminalized through the use of vagrancy statutes. This criminalization of vagrancy dates back to the 14th century enactment of the Statutes of Laborers. In 16th and 17th century Europe, "vagrants" were beaten and/or imprisoned with the intention of eliminating idleness and enforcing labor.

Section 41.18 of the Los Angeles Municipal Code (LAMC) was authored by former Councilmember Paul H. Lamport and originally enacted in 1963 as an anti-loitering law used to police public space in Los Angeles. The previous law noted that it was illegal to obstruct the sidewalk, but made it impossible to convict people who are blocking a sidewalk. In 1962, 77 persons living on Fairfax Ave. and Oakwood Ave. in the Fairfax District of Los Angeles were arrested by authorities who cited the old code as the reason. The cases were dismissed because even though they were living on the sidewalk it was still possible for people to pass through the area.

Lamport, working with the Hollywood Chamber of Commerce and the Merchantor's Association proposed a re-wording of the law to make it an effective law enforcement tool. It was passed unanimously by the Los Angeles City Council, which included Councilmembers Robert M. Wilkinson, Louis R. Nowell and Tom Bradley. Eventually, the Supreme Court's response was that it was unconstitutional to arrest people without offering means of visible support. As a result, if a person was arrested under LAMC Section 41.18 the amendments would remain in effect until the person arrested appealed to a higher court and won and then the entire municipal code section would become invalid.

== Role in judicial decisions ==
=== Jones v. City of Los Angeles ===
In 2003, the ACLU of Southern California and the National Lawyers Guild filed a case on behalf of an unhoused man named Edward Jones, who was one of six unhoused individuals who had been cited by the LAPD for sleeping on the sidewalk. The appellants had been living in the Skid Row neighborhood of Los Angeles for as long as two to forty years. The descriptions of their lives revealed a broad spectrum of the causes of their homelessness. Most were disabled, had limited mobility and were unable to stay employed due to their own or their spouse's physical or mental disabilities.

The appellants' various sources of support from Social Security, General Assistance, food stamps, and other programs were not enough to afford housing or pay for a hotel room every night. At the time, the number of unhoused people in Skid Row exceeded the number of available shelter beds resulting in them not always being able to obtain a bed in a free shelter. In conclusion, the court reviewed the availability of housing in Los Angeles and found that there was insufficient space available in hotels, shelters, and most especially permanent housing, leaving more than 1,000 persons in Skid Row without shelter each night.

The case revealed that there were nearly 50,000 more unhoused people than available shelter beds in all of Los Angeles County. The court determined that in this circumstance where the number of unhoused people exceeded the number of available beds-enforcement of the ordinance would violate appellants' Eighth Amendment rights. Jones and his wife were both unhoused and there were no shelters that permitted a childless couple to stay together. Their combined monthly general relief check was not sufficient to pay for a hotel room on Skid Row for the entire month.

In 2006, Jones v. City of Los Angeles came before the Ninth Circuit Court of Appeals. The court upheld a ruling that 41.18(d) was a violation of the Eighth Amendment, which prohibits cruel and unusual punishment. The settlement of the case concluded that the city of Los Angeles agreed not to enforce 41.18(d) until they had provided 1,250 units of permanent public housing.

The court affirmed that an individual may become homeless based on factors both within and beyond their immediate control, especially in consideration of the composition of the homeless as a group: the mentally ill, people with a substance use disorder, victims of domestic violence, the unemployed, and the unemployable and to convict people who are homeless who do not otherwise have options for housing or support is unconstitutional.

Despite the outcome, the conclusion from the Jones case still allows for additional challenges with anti-homeless laws. One challenge has been for petitioners with limited resources and support struggling to provide sufficient evidence that they had no choice other than to be on the streets, or i.e., that there were no beds available in shelters. Another implication of the Jones decision is forcing unhoused persons into shelters if they provide enough beds, thus making sleeping in public a crime and forcing them to sleep in places where they potentially have even less comfort and safety than they do on the streets. The conclusion of this pre-pandemic case has had consequences on the current pandemic world, as those experiencing homelessness may elect to not stay in a shelter because of their high vulnerability to disease. As a result, individuals choosing to avoid the acute danger of COVID-19 in shelters are left unprotected by law.

== Enforcement ==
The implementation and enforcement of the law has been uneven because the original law did not set a standard for who is to be arrested and moved, it only mentions what actions are illegal. When looking for actual enforcement of Section 41.18(d), data shows police tend to target unhoused people in the city. The law states that anyone who violates LAMC Section 41.18(d) shall be subject to the penalties set forth in LAMC Section 11.00, which states the violation as a misdemeanor, and an imprisonable offense that includes fines.

=== Encampment sweeps ===
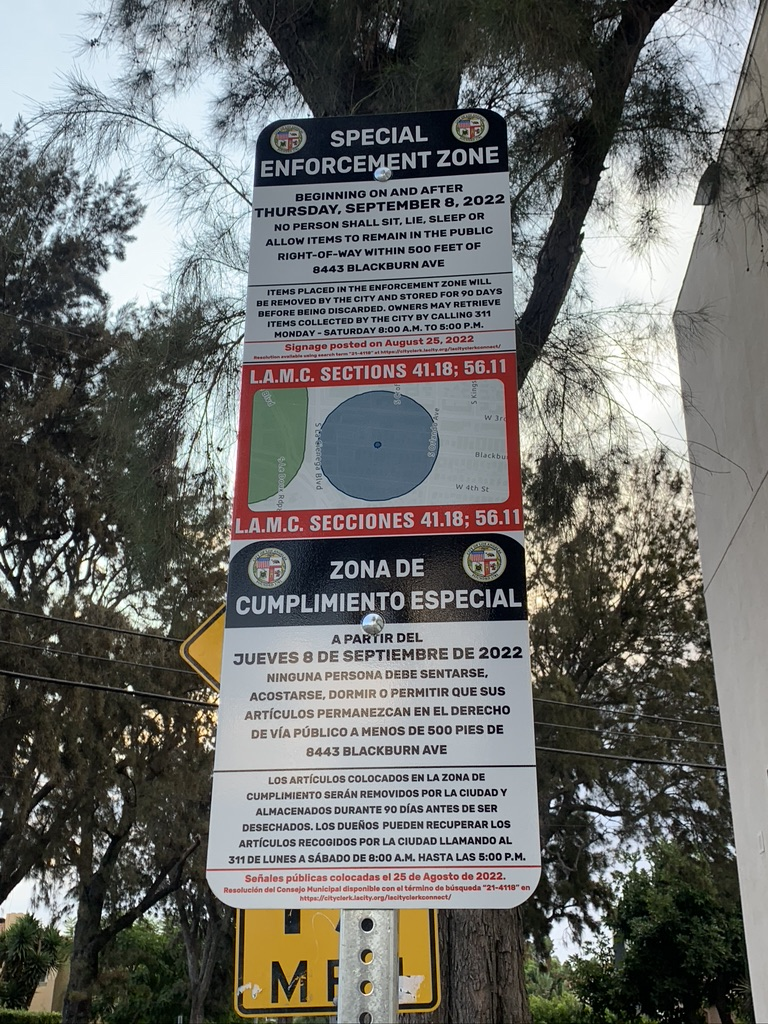
Signage for a 41.18 Special Enforcement Zone in Beverly Grove, Los Angeles

A homeless encampment sweep (or "clean-up") is the forced displacement of homeless encampments on public property and the removal of both unhoused individuals and their property from that area. Tactics vary between cities, suburbs and rural areas as to how much notice encampments are given before a sweep and what the city does with property collected during a sweep. Courts have held that failing to give sufficient notice before a sweep, so that people can act to keep their property safe, or destroying property during a sweep violates the rights of unhoused individuals. Federal judges have repeatedly issued court orders to stop the City of Los Angeles from seizing and destroying the property of unhoused people.

City of Los Angeles departments such as LA Sanitation, the Los Angeles Police Department, and City housing agencies work together to facilitate encampment sweeps under the guise of "environmental and public health protections". During sweeps, sanitation and police departments seize unhoused individuals' belongings and force mobility. Unhoused individuals are swept from one place to the next without offers of housing or services, facing a continuous cycle of displacement, social isolation and banishment.

=== Special Enforcement Zones ===
Special Enforcement Zones (SECZs) are council-designated special zones within their districts which step up enforcement of Section 41.18(d). The City Council votes on areas to become Special Enforcement Zones which states that persons and items placed in these zones will be removed by the city.

The zones are meant to apply to "sensitive use" sites, which includes everything from driveways, entrances, exits, fire hydrants, city-permitted activity, overpasses, streets, ADA access, public libraries, homeless shelters, parks and schools. In 2021, Councilmember Joe Buscaino set a motion to ban encampments 500 feet from all public schools and libraries. Special Enforcement Zones cover approximately 20% of the City of Los Angeles.

== Reception ==
=== Opponents ===
==== Services Not Sweeps ====
The Services Not Sweeps Coalition was a coalition of organizations and unhoused individuals in Los Angeles fighting for solutions that prioritize the public health concerns of unhoused residents. Services Not Sweeps was made up of over 35 community organizations demanding the Mayor of Los Angeles and the Los Angeles City Council put public health before politics and suspend the rollout of LAMC Section 41.18(d) in the current COVID-19 pandemic world. With evidence of a summary report of people experiencing homelessness who contracted COVID-19 in homeless shelters issued by the Centers for Disease Control and Prevention, Services Not Sweeps argued that forcing people to leave their encampments and disperse into the community goes against all available public health guidance, increases transmission rates, and disconnects people from critical medical care, outreach, and support.

=== Supporters ===
Supporters of the law are individuals who do not want homeless people taking up space outside of their business or home. The Los Angeles City Council of 1963 was ultimately the main supporter of 41.18, in addition to the council members since including those who amended this law on July 1, 2021, with a vote of 13–2. A second vote was required because it did not pass unanimously the first time around. The second vote also had 13 in favor and two against. Councilmembers Nithya Raman and Mike Bonin both voted against the ordinance. The amended Section 41.18(d) was co-authored by city council members Paul Krekorian and Mark Ridley-Thomas.

== Effects ==
Unhoused residents who are affected by Section 41.18 and experience encampment sweeps often lose vital personal belongings including but not limited to shelter protecting from the elements, warm clothing, personal hygiene supplies, food and medicine, as well as the loss of community which often leads to physical hardship, mental health trauma and in many cases death.

== See also ==
- Homelessness in California
