= Harriett Davenport =

American politician (1894–1976)

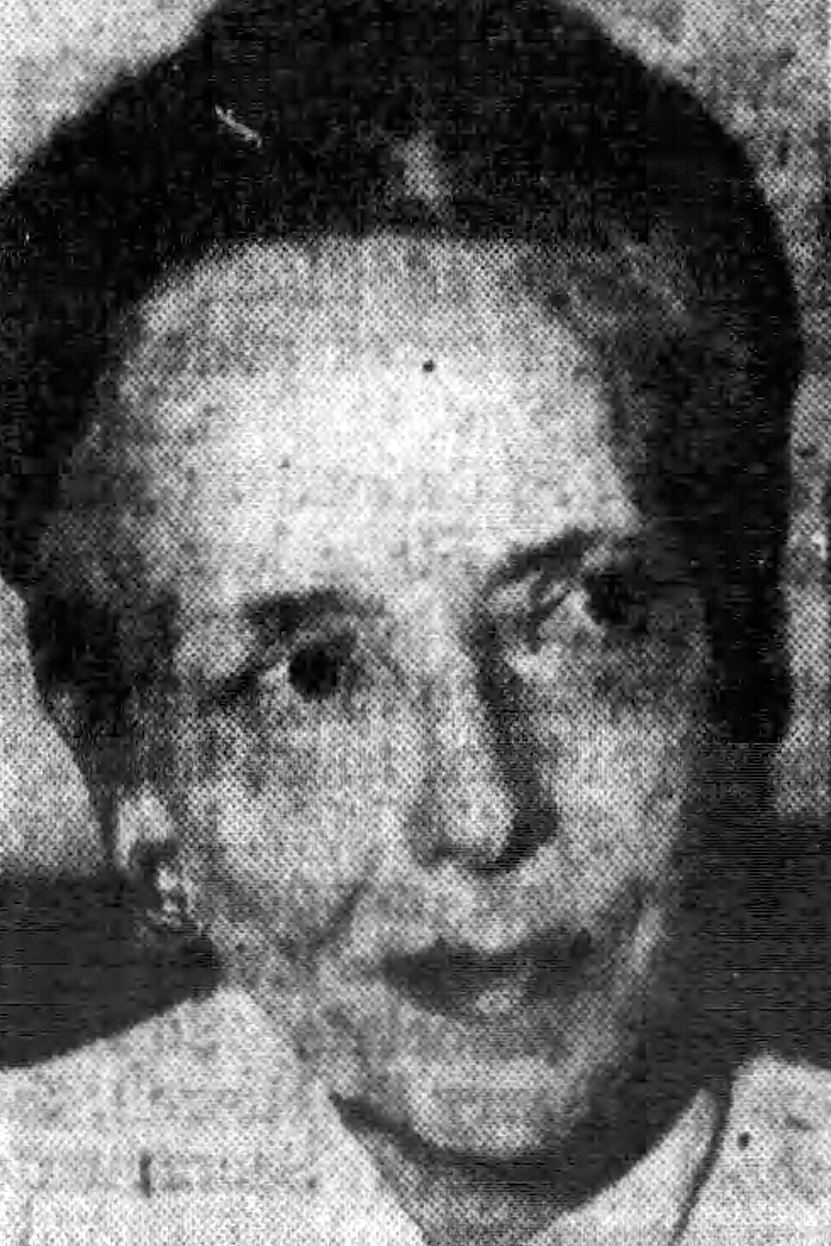
- Davenport in 1953

Member of the Los Angeles City Council from the 12th district
- In office September 1, 1953 – June 30, 1955
- Preceded by: Ed J. Davenport
- Succeeded by: Ransom M. Callicott

Personal details
- Born: Harriett Goodmanson; 1894 Victoria, British Columbia
- Died: July 23, 1976 (aged 81–82) Bellingham, Washington
- Spouse: Ed J. Davenport
- Occupation: Politician; teacher

Harriett Davenport (1894 – July 23, 1976) was an American politician who served on the Los Angeles City Council for the 12th district from 1953 to 1955 after the death of her husband, Ed J. Davenport. She was appointed by the City Council and served for a brief time before retiring due to her sister's ill health.

== Personal life ==
Davenport was born Harriett Goodmanson in Victoria, British Columbia, was brought to the United States when she was less than a year old and became a U.S. citizen through the citizenship of her father. She attended high school in Bellingham, Washington, the University of Washington and the University of California, Berkeley. She taught high school for four years in Chehalis, Washington. She and Ed J. Davenport were married in August 1935 in Seattle, Washington. They had no children.

After retiring, Davenport back moved to Whatcom County, Washington and died on July 23, 1976.

== Civic activities ==
Harriett Davenport "took some part" in the Small Property Owners' League, in Pro America and in groups of the Chamber of Commerce.

=== Elections ===
==== Appointment ====
In a unanimous vote by the City Council, Harriett Davenport was appointed to the 12th District seat on September 1, 1953, two months after her husband's death, the term to last until June 30, 1955. There were two other leading contenders for the council vacancy, Ransom M. Callicott, restaurant executive, and Geraldine Hadsell, minute clerk for the State Assembly, but Mrs. Davenport gained a majority of City Council votes in a closed caucus, and the vote was made unanimous later the same day. It was the first of two times that a wife succeeded her husband to a councilmanic seat, the second occurring in 1975, when Peggy Stevenson took over from Robert J. Stevenson after his death. Harriett Davenport was the third female council member, after Estelle Lawton Lindsey (elected 1915) and Rosalind Wiener Wyman (elected May 1953).

In 1954, she announced she would not run for election the next year because of the ill health of her sister. She was later appointed by Mayor Norris Poulson to the city's Fire and Police Pension Commission.

=== Positions ===
==== Harriett Davenport ====
1953, policies. Asked by a reporter after her election what her stand on policies would be, she replied, "I stand where my husband stood, and I will check his voting record as a guide."

1955, salaries. She urged passage of a charter amendment raising council pay, stating that the then-current salary of $600 a month was "nowhere near adequate, equitable or reasonable" and that "The pressure on the councilman never ends. His days consist of tensions, stormy sessions and forced decisions."

Preceded by Ed J. Davenport	Los Angeles City Council; 12th district 1953–55	Succeeded by Ransom M. Callicott
