= Meade McClanahan =

American politician

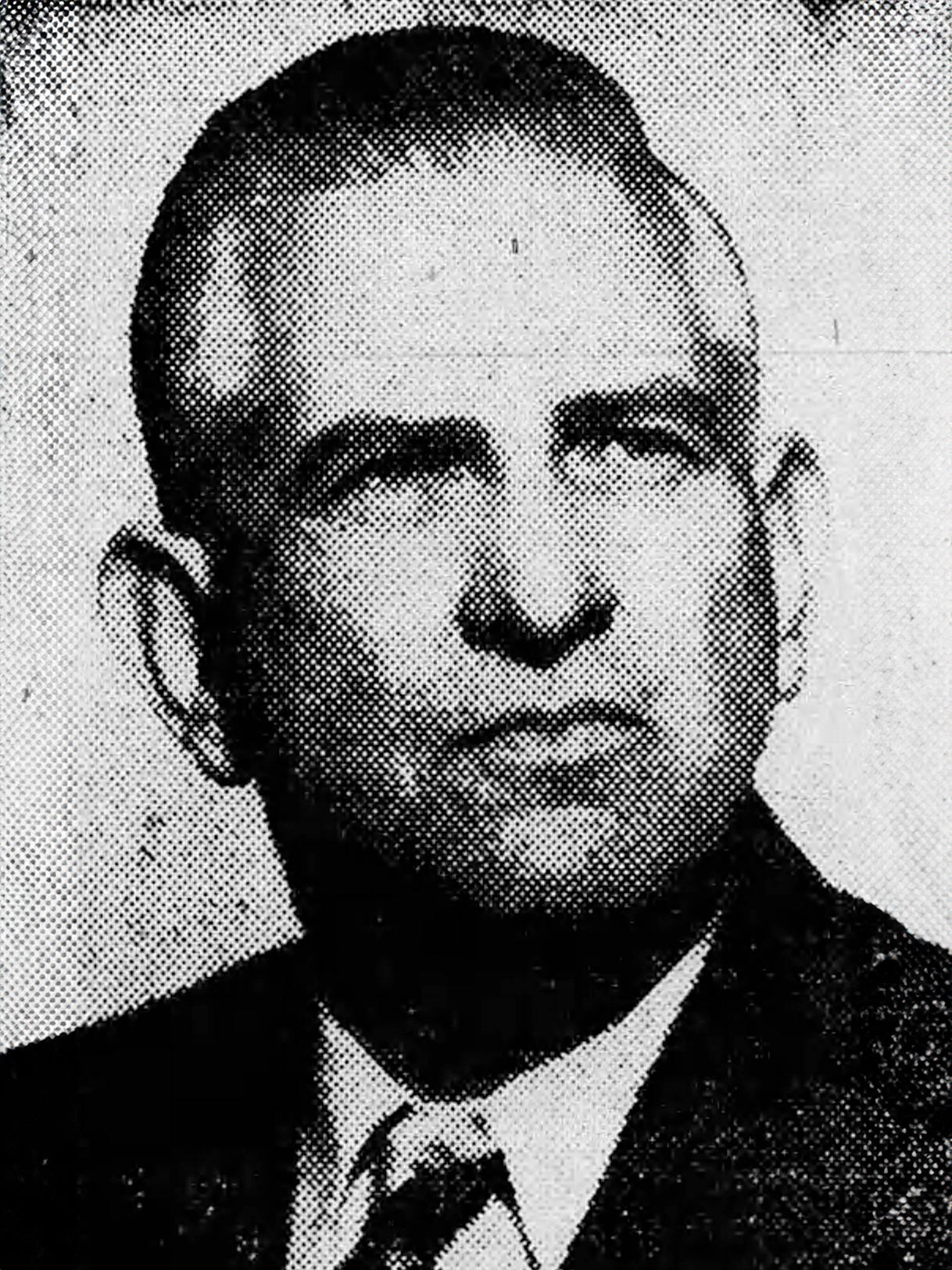
- McClanahan in 1952

Member of the Los Angeles City Council for the 13th district
- In office April 6, 1945 – March 19, 1946
- Preceded by: Ned R. Healy
- Succeeded by: John R. Roden

Personal details
- Born: November 23, 1893 Los Angeles, California
- Died: October 5, 1959 (aged 65) Los Angeles, California
- Party: Republican (until 1952); Democratic (from 1952)

Thomas Meade McClanahan Jr. (November 23, 1893 – October 5, 1959) was an industrial engineer and businessman who was elected to the Los Angeles City Council in 1945 but was ousted by voters in 1946 based upon his support for controversial preacher and political organizer Gerald L. K. Smith.

== Biography ==
A native of Whisler, Ohio, McClanahan was married to Beulah McClanahan on January 1, 1914, in Chillicothe, Ohio, and moved to Southern California around 1930, where, as an industrial engineer, he operated a foundry at 1423 Riverside Drive. McClanahan identified as being Irish Catholic. The two separated in October 1954 and were divorced in January 1955 after Beulah McClanahan testified her husband used a "judo cut" on the back of her neck after watching wrestling on television. Mrs. McClanahan got the family home at 2325 Riverside Terrace at Riverside Drive, and her husband kept his business, the Ace Tank and Boiler Company of Maywood, California, which he operated with a son, Bernard.

He died at the age of 65 on October 5, 1959, of amyotrophic lateral sclerosis (Lou Gehrig's disease) after a long illness, in Glendale, leaving a wife, Alice Moore, an attorney; two sons, Bernard E. McClanahan of Whittier and Thomas Meade McClanahan of Los Angeles; and a daughter, Beverly N. Cabral of Los Angeles. Burial was at Forest Lawn Memorial Park, Glendale.

== Public life ==
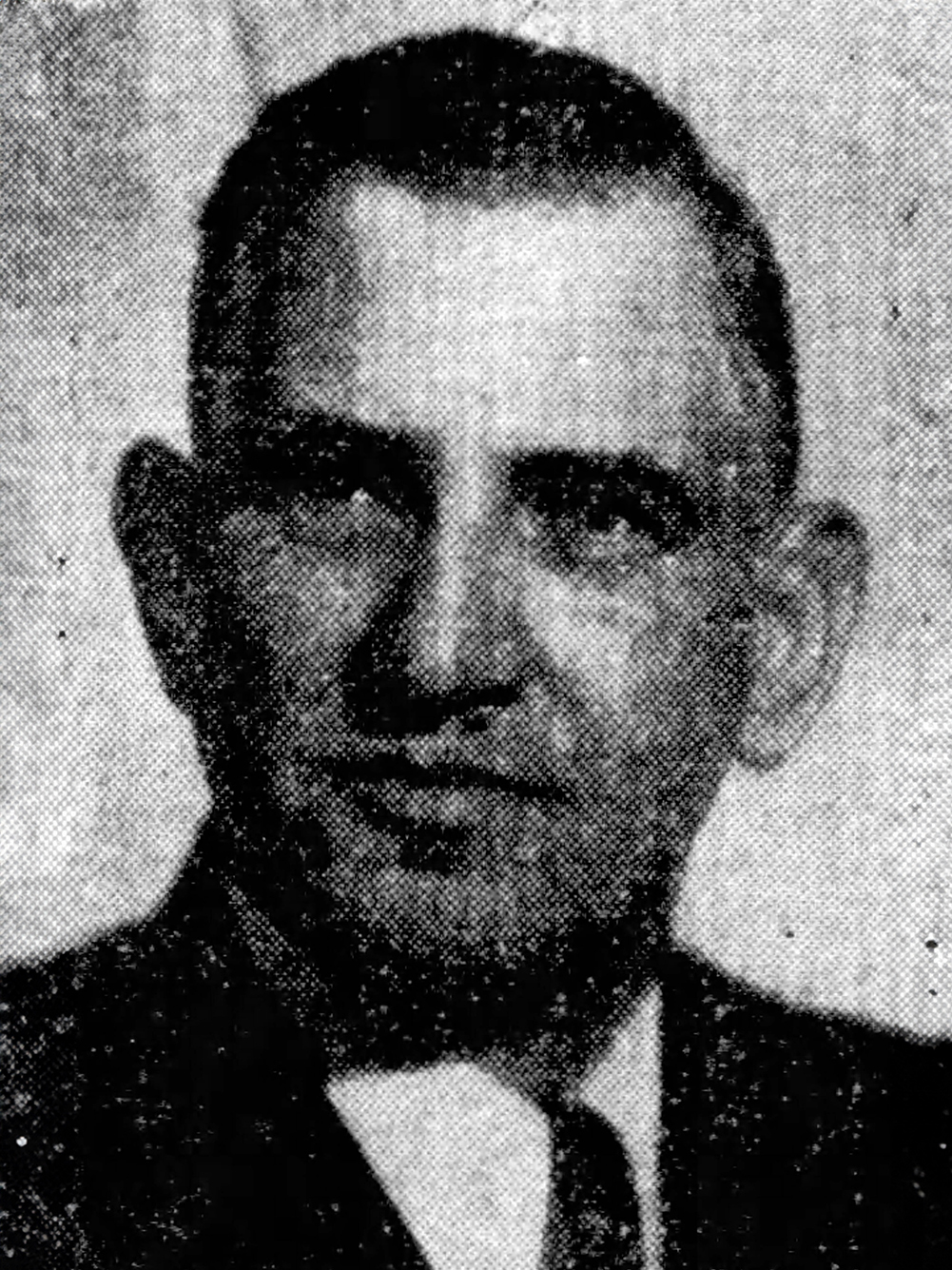
McClanahan in 1946.

McClanahan ran for the Los Angeles School Board in 1939. At that time he was sponsoring a radio program, "Los Angeles Speaks," which opposed the political activities of political figure Clifford E. Clinton.

In February 1939, McClanahan was president of the Riverside Drive District Business Men's Association. In that year he was sued, along with two others, by Clifford E. Clinton on a charge of criminal libel for having sponsored a radio program that attacked Clinton and for helping to publish a booklet that referred to Clinton as "Der Los Angeles Fuehrer." He and the other defendants were acquitted in a jury trial. Clinton also filed a civil suit for defamation; it was dismissed in 1945 because Clinton did not proceed with the action.

In September 1942 McClanahan brought suit against the city, the chief of police and other officials, seeking to block the installation of parking meters in the city.

=== City Council ===
==== Election ====
McClanahan first ran for the City Council in 1943, but finished third in the primary that year. He was elected in 1946 over Joseph W. Aldlin, who had labor backing, to represent Los Angeles City Council District 13, succeeding Ned R. Healy, who had resigned to go to the U.S. Congress. In those days the district represented Silver Lake and an area west of downtown to Vermont Avenue and south to Valley Boulevard.

==== Positions ====
Tax, 1945. As chairman of the City Council revenue and taxation committee, McClanahan proposed a 5% tax on theater tickets and a 10% tax on athletic contests as a way to avoid a planned garbage-collection charge or to help finance the Hyperion outfall sewer.

Pickets, 1945. He submitted a resolution advocating new legislation giving the mayor and police more authority to deal with picket lines being used by union workers in a Hollywood film strike. He claimed that pickets in front of theaters "had forced women and children to walk in the street to get past them" and that efforts were made to "prevent servicemen from buying tickets." He later urged a "no" vote on his own resolution to avoid embarrassing any other council member.

Americanism, 1945. He made a suggestion that children being cared for in public day-care centers be taught "Americanism" and be shielded from "subversive foreign ideologies." The idea was defeated largely because other council members deemed the wording to be too general.

==== Recall ====
A recall movement against McClanahan was based upon his association at public meetings with controversial political organizer Gerald L. K. Smith, founder of the America First Party. McClanahan issued a statement saying that he disagreed with Smith "on many points" but that he participated in the meetings because of "my belief in free speech and free assembly." On March 19, 1946, McClanahan was recalled from office by a vote of 12,394 to 8,913, and John R. Roden was elected in his place.

==== Return attempt ====
McClanahan ran anew for reelection in 1947 but finished third in a field of four. He also ran for election to the US House of Representatives in 1952.

| Preceded by Ned R. Healy | Los Angeles City Council; 13th District; 1945–46 | Succeeded by John R. Roden |
