= James Harvey Brown =

American politician and judge

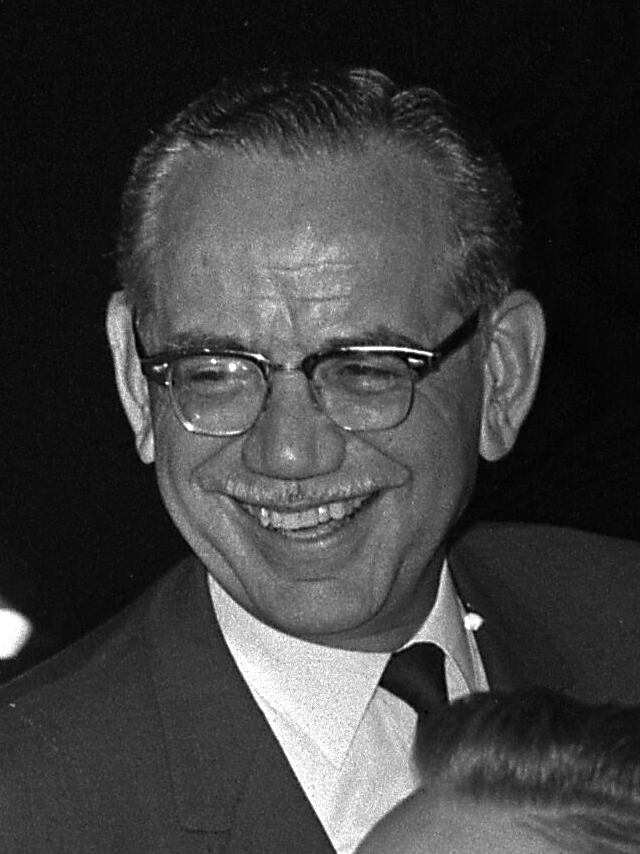
- Brown in 1962

Member of the Los Angeles City Council from the 13th district
- In office July 1, 1959 – December 28, 1964
- Preceded by: Ernest E. Debs
- Succeeded by: Paul H. Lamport

Personal details
- Born: April 26, 1906 Jamestown, North Dakota
- Died: July 10, 1995 (aged 89) Glendale, California
- Party: Democratic

James Harvey Brown (April 26, 1906 – July 10, 1995) was a City Council member in Los Angeles, California, between 1959 and 1964 and then municipal court judge in that city from 1964 to 1985.

== Biography ==
Brown was born on April 26, 1906, in Jamestown, North Dakota. After graduating from high school, he went to sea as a chief radio operator and later worked as a disc jockey at radio stations KFOX and KGER. He earned a degree in engineering from UCLA and was chief engineer at KFAC and KGER. In 1937 he became master control supervisor for NBC. During World War II he was a Navy lieutenant assigned to airborne radar design, working at Massachusetts Institute of Technology and other laboratories. After earning a degree from Southwestern University School of Law, he was both president of and attorney for the National Association of Broadcast Employees and Technicians.

He was vice chair of the California Democratic Party, 1948–58. He was a Congregationalist.

Brown died July 10, 1995, at the age of 89 in Glendale, California. Cause of death was given as heart failure. Interment was at Forest Lawn Memorial Park, Glendale. Survivors were his wife, Margaret; a daughter, Dorothy O'Leary; a son, James Harvey Brown, Jr.; and two sisters, Blanche Tibbot and Betty Dykstra.

== Public service ==
A "conservative Democrat," Brown ran unsuccessfully for seats in the State Assembly and the U.S. House of Representatives.

=== City Council ===
In 1959 Brown ran for the Los Angeles City Council District 13 seat to fill the two years left in Ernest E. Debs's term when Debs was elected to the Los Angeles County Board of Supervisors. Brown took office immediately after his victory over Charles Bigler in May of that year. He was reelected in 1961 to a four-year term, which he did not complete because of his appointment to a municipal court judgeship.

In 1960 the 13th District included most of Hollywood. It extended from the Alhambra city limits to Fairfax Avenue.

Brown "helped develop Dodger Stadium and Los Angeles International Airport," according to the Los Angeles Times.

=== Municipal judge ===
In 1964, Governor Edmund G. (Pat) Brown appointed Councilman Brown as a municipal court judge. He was sworn in on December 28, with his wife, Ruth Brown, as a witness. His pay was to be $23,000 a year, compared with the $12,000 he was receiving as a councilman.

Brown was the first judge to be assigned to Los Angeles's first night traffic court in 1965. In 1966 he headed a committee of judges that agreed to set up a central, computerized file of all outstanding warrants in the county.

Brown presided over the preliminary hearing for eleven members of the Black Panther Party who were charged with taking part in a four-hour gun battle with police officers from their Central Avenue headquarters in December 1969. He termed their activities "armed anarchy" and bound them over for trial in Superior Court.

In 1971 Brown was a leading proponent of a plan to reduce the number of jurors required in a misdemeanor trial from twelve to six. The idea was rejected by the State Senate.

Brown was on the municipal court bench for a decade before retiring in 1985.

== Ham radio ==
He was also a ham-radio (amateur radio) operator, with the call letters W6VH, and he was a charter member of the Pacific Pioneer Broadcasters, the Society of Wireless Pioneers and the Radio Club of America.

In 1973 he returned to the City Hall to fight a request by Santa Monica Mountains homeowners to curb "unsightly aerials" of amateur radio operators on hillside rooftops that interfered with the view from expensive lots. Brown said that ham operators had provided valuable communication links in disasters like the Sylmar earthquake and floods. A city council committee rejected any further control.

Preceded by Ernest E. Debs	Los Angeles City Council; 13th District; 1959–64	Succeeded by Paul H. Lamport
