= Freedom from Hunger =

International development organization

- Company type: Non-profit
- Founded: 1946
- Headquarters: Davis, California, United States
- Key people: Steve Hollingworth
- Services: Microfinance; Public Health; Ending Poverty
- Revenue: 4,226,678 United States dollar (2017)
- Total assets: 670,214 United States dollar (2022)
- Website: www.freedomfromhunger.org

Freedom from Hunger (established in 1946, and now part of the Grameen Foundation) is an international development nonprofit organization working in nineteen countries. Freedom from Hunger focuses on providing small loans and business education to poor women.

== History ==
Meals for Millions was originally founded by Henry Borsook, a Caltech biochemist, and Clifford Clinton, a California restaurateur. Dr. Borsook and Mme. Soulange Berzceller, a skilled French cook, together developed Multi-Purpose Food (MPF), a high-protein food supplement that could be made for just three cents per 2-ounce meal. This led to the founding of Meals for Millions as a not-for-profit organization in 1946. Clinton funded the first years of MFM's operation, which then relied on public donations.

During the first ten years, 6.5 million pounds (36 million meals) of MPF were distributed to relief agencies in 129 countries, including the United States. The original MPF consisted of composed of 68.0% of soy grits, 23.4% dehydrated vegetables, and 8.6% seasonings. In late 1950s, the MPF was reformulated to simply contain toasted defatted soy grits with vitamins and minerals. This new food was 50% protein by weight and completely pre-cooked. Each 2-ounce serving provided more than one-third of a 70 kilograms (150 lb) adult's daily needs for protein and 10 vitamins and minerals. MPF was made by General Mills in Minneapolis until 1980.

By 1965 the MFM has also started working on education and technology transfer as a way to reduce hunger lastingly under the new technological advisor Mark Sterner. MPF plants run by local people were set up in Japan, Brazil, Mexico, and Korea. The USAID starting funding MFM since 1973. In 1976, MFM developed a low-cost extrusion cooker for making the MPF.

In 1976, Peter Davies took over as MFM's technical advisor. The MFM began implementing Applied Nutrition Programs, focusing on the health and nutrition of mothers and children. In 1979, the MFM merged with the American Freedom from Hunger Foundation (founded 1961). The MPF stopped being made by MFM in 1980.

In 1988, the organization was officially renamed the Freedom From Hunger Foundation. In the same year, it developed the world's first integrated microcredit health and nutrition education program called "Credit with Education".

In 1991, the organization was renamed simply to Freedom From Hunger. It was merged into Grameen foundation in 2016.

== Freedom from Hunger Day ==
In October 2006, The Yolo County Board of Supervisors proclaimed September 28 to be Freedom from Hunger Day "in recognition of Freedom from Hunger's 60 years in fighting hunger with self-help programs that achieve a lasting end to hunger while promoting the dignity of women and families living in poverty." The date was also declared an official day of awareness by the State of California. In the Sacramento area, the event won a gold public relations award.

== See also ==
- Bread for the World – Nationwide Christian citizens movement seeking justice for the world's hungry people by lobbying.
- Empty Bowls – A project where participants create ceramic bowls, then serve a simple meal of soup and bread. In exchange for a meal and the bowl, the guest gives a suggested minimum donation of ten dollars. The meal sponsors and/or guests choose a hunger-fighting organization to receive the money collected.
- Food First – A member-supported, nonprofit 'peoples' think tank and education-for-action center. Their work highlights root causes and value-based solutions to hunger and poverty around the world.
- World Bank PovertyNet – The PovertyNet site is maintained by the Poverty Reduction Group, part of the Poverty Reduction and Economic Management Network at the World Bank. The site provides resources and support for people working to understand and alleviate hunger.
- World Food Programme – WFP works to put hunger at the centre of the international agenda, promoting policies, strategies and operations that directly benefit the poor and hungry.
- World Hunger Relief – Provided for a program in agroforestry and related technologies to address the needs of the hungry, both foreign and domestic.
