= Clifford Clinton =

California restaurateur and public benefactor (1900–1969)

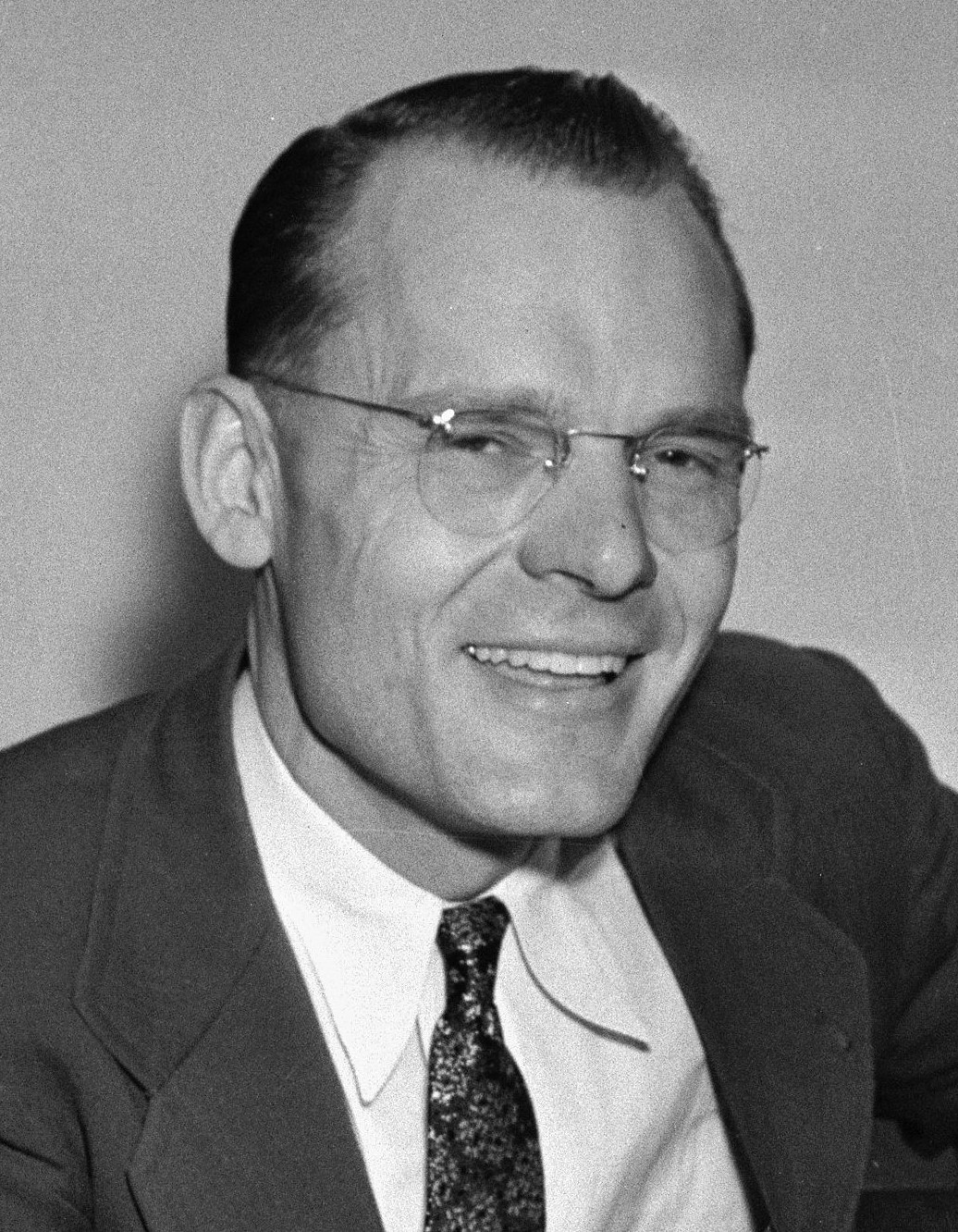
Clinton in 1937.

Clifford E. Clinton (August 3, 1900 – November 20, 1969) was a California restaurateur who founded Meals for Millions, one of two parent organizations of Freedom from Hunger, in 1946. Clifford E. Clinton was also owner of a cafeteria-style restaurant chain named Clifton's.

== Food charity ==
In 1944, Clinton asked Henry Borsook, a Caltech biochemist, to develop a food supplement that would provide proper nutritional values while costing no more than five cents per meal. Clinton offered $5,000 of his own money to finance the research. In less than one year, Borsook and Mme. Soulange Berzceller, a skilled French cook, together developed Multi-Purpose Food (MPF), a high-protein food supplement that could be made for just three cents per 2-ounce meal. This led to the founding of Meals for Millions as a not-for-profit organization in 1946.

During the next ten years, 6.5 million pounds (36 million meals) of MPF were distributed to relief agencies in 129 countries, including the United States. The original MPF consisted of composed of 68.0% of soy grits, 23.4% dehydrated vegetables, and 8.6% seasonings. Clinton funded the first few years of MFM's operation.

Additionally, Clinton opened his so-called "Penny Restaurant" in 1931, at the height of the Great Depression to serve people who could not otherwise afford a meal. He combined his first name and family name into "Clifton's" restaurant, which still exists in Los Angeles. The restaurant not only featured low prices, but also a multi-story dining experience, complete with themed dining areas (e.g. rainforest, etc.), musicians to entertain diners, and additional free services to assist jobseekers.

== Anti-corruption politics ==
Clinton was involved with anti-corruption politics in Los Angeles in the 1930s and ran for mayor in 1945. According to historian Thomas Reppetto, Clinton may have been a target of LAPD harassment:

Despite Chief [Jim] Davis's efforts, the vice problem and the radicals remained troublesome. In addition to the Red squad, the police department maintained a separate intelligence unit under Captain Earl Kynette, an experienced vice cop who undertook special investigations for Mayor Shaw and Chief Davis, including keeping an eye on alleged radicals such as State Assemblyman Sam Yorty. An even greater challenge to the police were the antivice forces of the city led by Clifford Clinton, a restaurateur who was president of the Citizens Independent Vice Investigating Committee (CIVIC). Clinton, the son of missionary parents, allowed his restaurant customers to pay whatever they chose, and during the Depression many people ate free. Strangely, after he undertook his CIVIC responsibilities, Clinton's taxes rose, a number of patrons claimed food poisoning, and several suffered nasty falls on his premises. Clinton himself also became accident-prone as trick motorcyclists and stunt men ran into or fell under his car. In October 1937 Clinton's house was bombed. Many suspected that behind such events was the fine hand of the intelligence squad.

== In popular culture ==
=== Music ===
- Alternative rock band The Toxhards's 2026 single "Mr. Clifford" tells the story of Clinton's political efforts from the perspective of a smear campaign by the corrupt politicians he opposed.

== See also ==
- Ransom M. Callicott, partner with Clinton
- Meade McClanahan, Los Angeles manufacturer sued by Clinton for criminal libel
