= National Association of Broadcast Employees and Technicians =

American trade union

- National Association of Broadcast Employees and Technicians, the Broadcasting and Cable Television Workers Sector of the Communications Workers of America
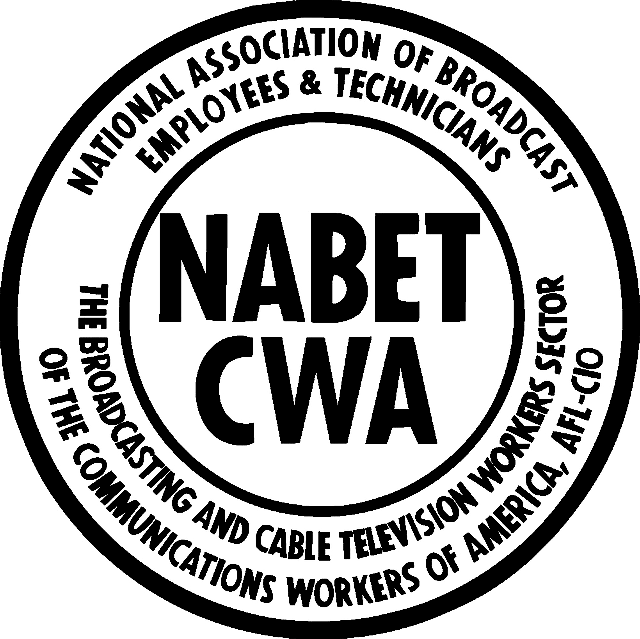
- Abbreviation: NABET-CWA
- Formation: 1934; 92 years ago
- Type: Labor union
- Headquarters: Washington, DC, US
- Location: United States
- Parent organization: Communications Workers of America (since 1994)
- Website: nabetcwa.org
- Formerly called: Association of Technical Employees

The National Association of Broadcast Employees and Technicians, the Broadcasting and Cable Television Workers Sector of the Communications Workers of America (NABET-CWA) is a labor union representing employees in television, radio, film, and media production. A division of the Communications Workers of America (CWA), NABET represents about 12,000 workers organized into about 35 local unions ("locals").

The union was first organized in 1934 as the Association of Technical Employees (ATE), at first covering employees involved in network television and radio; the union was created by NBC as a way to prevent its own workers from joining the International Brotherhood of Electrical Workers. The ATE would soon expand to other radio networks, and by 1937, ATE also included independent radio and television stations. In 1939 the ATE achieved a union shop clause.

The union's name changed to NABET in 1940 and was affiliated with the Congress of Industrial Organizations (CIO) in 1951. In 1952 Canadian radio, television and film workers were entered into the NABET fold. In 1965, NABET expanded to include workers in the film industry.

In 1968, Canadian NABET locals achieved local autonomy followed in 1974 by full autonomy. These locals are now part of Unifor.

In 1987, NABET lost a 118-day strike against NBC, losing 200 union-member jobs, accepting a "watered-down contract", costing the union $700,000 a month in strike benefits, and costing strikers an estimated $44 million in lost wages.

In 1994, NABET merged with the CWA and changed its name to NABET-CWA.

In 2021, NABET-CWA helped organize two units of tech and digital workers in NPR's Digital Media, Communications, and Audience Growth divisions as a part of the Campaign to Organize Digital Employees (CODE-CWA) initiative to organize tech workers in the US and Canada. In 2025, a unit of 152 technical employees at NBCUniversal Media Group voted, by a margin of 61 to 23, to join NABET-CWA.

== Presidents ==
George Smith, president (1957–?)

James Harvey Brown, president (?–?)

Its current officers are Sector President Charles G. Braico and Sector Vice President Lou Marinaro, both elected on June 6, 2015.
