= Empty Bowls =

Charity organization

Empty Bowls is an international project to fight hunger, personalised by artists and art organizations on a community level. The money raised is donated to soup kitchens, food banks and other organizations fighting hunger locally.

The promotion and growth of the project was originally managed by The Imagine/RENDER Group, a 501(c)(3) organization. Each community's events are independent. The project expands one group of concerned artists and students at a time, and events take place in many areas in the United States and Canada, often in conjunction with the United Nations sponsored World Food Day. Empty Bowls now supports food related charities around the world.

== Charitable concept ==
Empty Bowls allows participating artists and groups to create and donate bowls, then serve a simple meal. In some communities, ceramic artists are joined by wood turners, glassblowers, fiber artists, metal smiths, painters, sculptors, and other artists and craftspeople. In most cases guests choose a bowl to use that day and to keep as a reminder of all the empty bowls in the world. The artists often work in conjunction with local restaurants, groceries, and kitchens to provide a variety of foods for the attendees to sample.

== Project development ==
This project was founded by Lisa Blackburn and art teacher John Hartom in 1990-91 when they joined a drive to raise charitable funds in Hartom's Michigan community. His idea was to organize a charitable event to give artists and art students a way to make a personal difference. Hartom's students made ceramic bowls in their high school art classes. The finished products were then used as serving pieces for a fund-raising meal of soup and bread. Contributing guests kept the empty bowl. During the next year, Hartom and other participants developed this concept into the Empty Bowls project. The Imagine/RENDER Group, a 501(c)(3) organisation, was created to promote the project.

== Hosts/Events ==
- Marshall University, Huntington, WV
- University of Vermont Living/Learning Center Burlington, VT
- RISD Providence, RI
- Sawmill Pottery Putnam, CT
- Houston Empty Bowls
- TC Roberson High School Empty Bowls
- Kent School Empty Bowls
- Flagstaff Arts and Leadership Academy - Flagstaff, AZ
- TerraNova Equestrian Center- Myakka City, FL
- Warren Wilson College - Swannanoa, NC
- Wellesley High School Empty Bowls (Babson Partnership), Wellesley, MA (Nov. 17)
- The Jesse Tree and The Unitarian Universalist Fellowship of Galvestn County Galveston, TX
