= Paul H. Lamport =

American politician

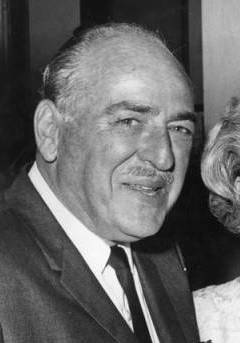
- Lamport in 1965

Member of the Los Angeles City Council for the 13th district
- In office July 1, 1933 – June 30, 1939
- Preceded by: James Harvey Brown
- Succeeded by: Robert J. Stevenson

Personal details
- Born: February 3, 1907; Los Angeles, California, U.S.
- Died: April 2, 1984 (aged 77); Los Angeles, California, U.S.
- Political party: Democratic

Paul Harry Lamport (February 3, 1907 – April 2, 1984) was a Hollywood, California, developer and civic leader who was a Los Angeles City Council member between 1965 and 1969.

== Biography ==
=== Family ===
Lamport was born February 3, 1907, in Los Angeles, the son of William H. and Frances Lamport. He was married in December 1945 to Ruth G. Lamport of Saint Louis, Missouri. They had a son, Stanley William Lamport.

=== Education ===
His official biography dated February 1967, on file in the Los Angeles Public Library, says that he went to "Polytechnical" High School and that he took college courses through the United States Armed Forces Institute and Los Angeles University College of Law. It states that he was awarded an honorary Doctor of Law degree from California College of Law.

=== Military service ===
His biography states that he was inducted into the Army on November 19, 1942, and served in the European Theater of Operations. "Received battlefield commission in France in 1944. Earned 7 battle stars. Wrote Army handbook on mess management under combat conditions. Extracts of handbook adopted by War Department. Received commendation for this work, signed by Brig. Gen. D.O. Elliott. Honorably discharged October 28, 1944."

=== Civic and business activities ===
His biography states he was a director of the Hollywood Chamber of Commerce, president of the Hollywood Property Owners Association and was commodore of the Long Beach Yacht Club and president of the Civic Regatta Association, which began the Southern California Mid-Winter Regatta. He was "part owner or in several business partnerships involving real estate holdings" and was director of the Metropolitan Bank of Hollywood. He also said in a letter to Paul Coates of the Los Angeles Times that he had at one time been a newspaperman.

=== Illness and death ===
Lamport suffered a stroke in 1980 and died on April 2, 1984, at the age of 77. He was survived by his wife, Ruth, and a son, Stanley.

== City Council ==
=== Elections ===
Lamport was appointed by the City Council in early 1965 to represent Los Angeles City Council District 13 in succession to James Harvey Brown, who had been named a municipal court judge. In that era, the 13th District included Hollywood, Silver Lake, Echo Park and portions of Los Feliz and Lincoln Heights.

Lamport's principal opponent in the election that followed later that year was Mary Tinglof, a former president of the city Board of Education, and a liberal. During the campaign, it was reported that Lamport had misrepresented his academic record and falsely claimed a combat medal for bravery, the Silver Star, among other alleged misstatements in his campaign literature. Lamport said he had attended the schools claimed in his publicity, although he did not complete more than the 10th grade in high school. He said he had received a certificate for the medal but could not find it. It was also revealed that Lamport had been arrested and fined in September 1938 for the illegal possession of two slot machines in a restaurant at 10271 Pico Boulevard, but Mayor Sam Yorty vociferously defended Lamport and threatened to walk out of a news conference and cancel any more as long as reporters insisted on asking him about the situation. Lamport won the election in the final round over Tinglof.

In 1969, "the flamboyant Lamport" lost the election to his former deputy, Robert J. Stevenson. Before that election, the Engineers and Architects Association had charged that Lamport had shown "bias, prejudice and intolerance" in writing a letter accusing the association's representative in City Hall of being "most ineffective, stupid and unaggressive."

Three years later, Lamport was appointed by Mayor Yorty as a member of his staff.

=== Positions ===
- Industrial land. Lamport urged in 1966 that vacant industrial land be sheltered from taxes so that the owners would have an incentive to leave it undeveloped rather than asking for rezoning to another purpose. "Man's dignity begins with a permanent job, not one created by relief or any governmental agency," he said. "The problem of saving our industrial land is even more serious than forming a Human Relations Commission or anything else like that."
- Hollywood expansion. His 1966 attempt to expand the borders of the Hollywood district to include Universal City and part of North Hollywood failed in the midst of objections from those areas.
- Water and power. Lamport was briefly a candidate to head the Los Angeles Department of Water and Power after the resignation of General Manager and Chief Engineer Samuel B. Nelson.
- Hippie invasion. He complained that city departments were engaged in a "secret" program to "welcome an invasion of 100,000 hippies" to Los Angeles in summer 1967 and proposed a resolution that would order the departments to "cease and desist" from according any "dissident non-conformist groups" any special consideration. It was defeated by 7 votes to 5, requiring 8 votes to pass. The next year another of his proposals was passed unanimously, an ordinance "designed to keep hippies from annoying and molesting people on Hollywood streets."

=== Quotations ===
- "Having been a newspaperman at one time, I realize that in-depth journalism costs money; however, responsible journalism costs nothing but a little extra thought."

| Preceded by James Harvey Brown | Los Angeles City Council; 13th District; 1965–69 | Succeeded by Robert J. Stevenson |
