= Peter J. Pitchess =

American politician (1912–1999)

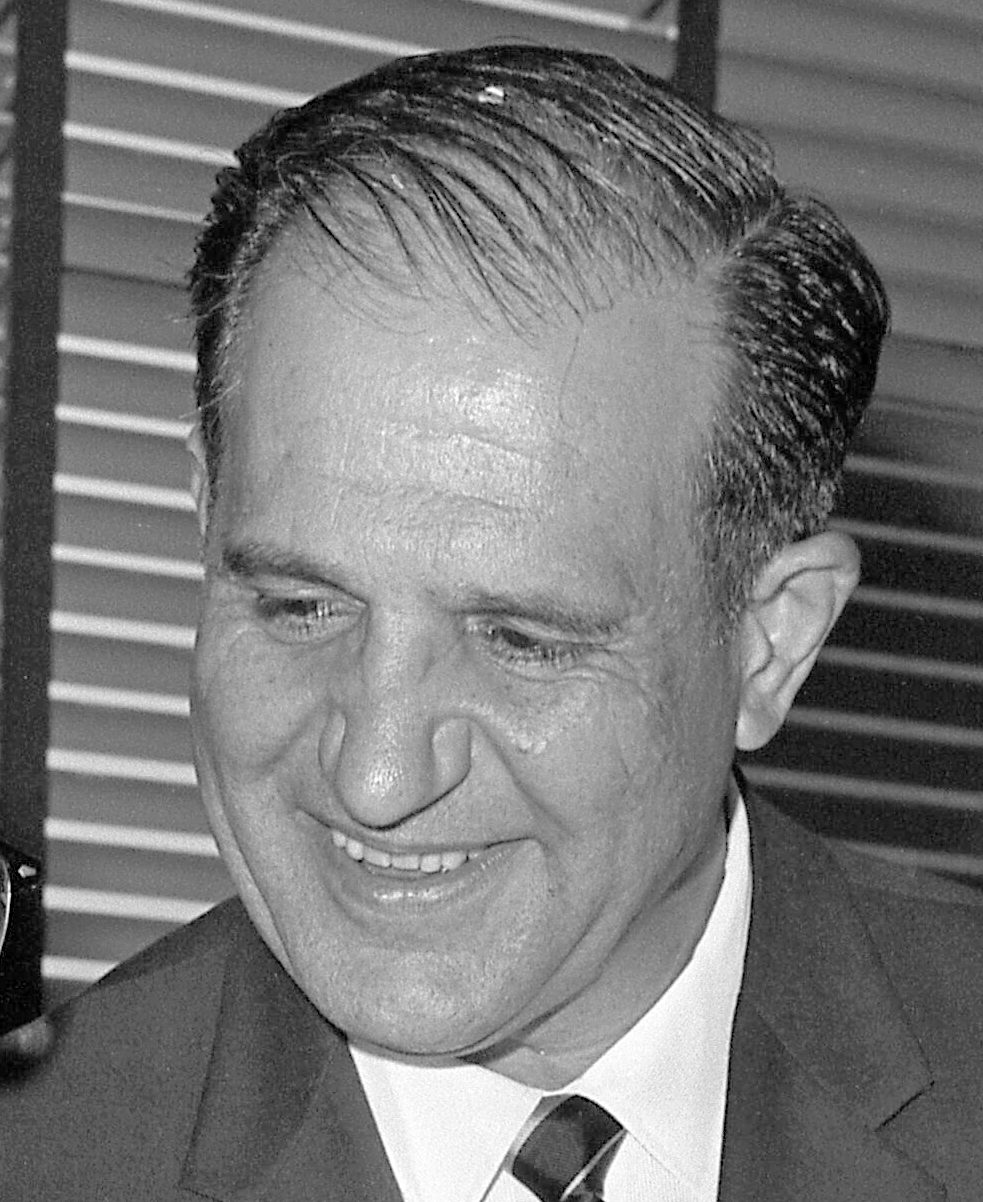
- Pitchess in 1965
- Born: February 26, 1912; Salt Lake City, Utah
- Died: April 4, 1999 (aged 87); Newport Beach, California
- Resting place: Pacific View Memorial Park, Corona del Mar, California; 33.610068°N 117.853822°W
- Police career
- Department: Federal Bureau of Investigation; Los Angeles County Sheriff's Department
- Service years: 1953 – 1982
- Rank: 1953: Appointed as Under-Sheriff; 1958: elected Sheriff

Peter J. Pitchess (February 26, 1912 – April 4, 1999) was the 28th sheriff of Los Angeles County, California, serving from 1958 to 1981. He is credited with modernizing the Los Angeles County Sheriff's Department, turning the department into the sixth-largest police department, and the largest sheriff's department, in the United States.

== Early life and career ==
Pitchess was born in Salt Lake City, Utah. He was orphaned as a child, and attended Bingham High School in Bingham, Utah. He received his Bachelor of Science degree from the University of Utah, and his Juris Doctor degree from the university's law school, earning his law school tuition by working in the mines in Bingham, Utah.

Pitchess started his career as a special agent with the Federal Bureau of Investigation (FBI), spending 12 years with that agency, in Washington, D.C.; El Paso, Texas; Kansas City, Missouri; and Los Angeles. He rose to head the criminal investigative section of the Bureau's Los Angeles field office, resigning in 1952. Pitchess spent a year in the private sector, taking a position as chief of security for the Richfield Oil Company, before becoming under-sheriff, reporting to sheriff Eugene Biscailuz. He was elected Sheriff in 1958 upon Biscailuz's retirement.

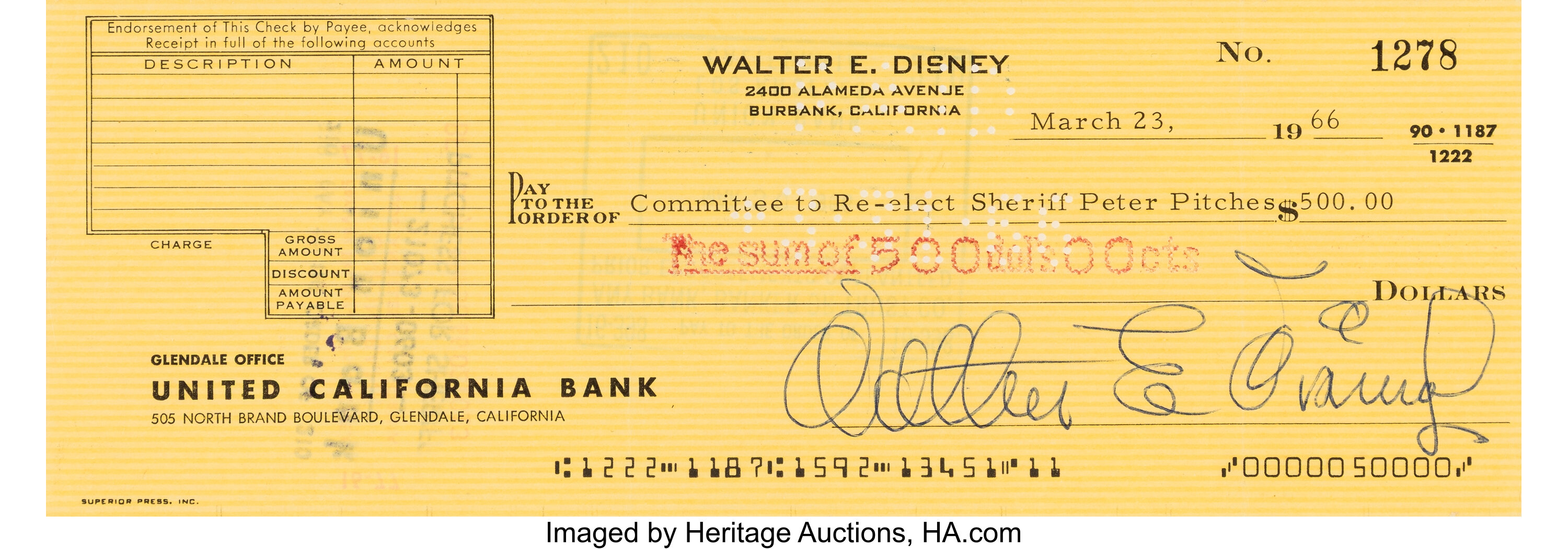
Pitchess was re-elected in 1966; his campaign supporters included Walt Disney, who donated $500 (nearly $5,000 in 2026 money) via this check

During Pitchess' 23 years as sheriff, he eliminated the county's informal posse comitatus, introduced the use of helicopters for car chases and crowd control, and set up the Special Enforcement Bureau ("SEB"), one of the first SWAT teams in the United States. He linked the geographically separated offices and jails with Teletype machines for faster communication, and computerized the offices records in the 1960s. Pitchess also put in place a program allowing smaller communities to contract with the sheriff's department as an alternative to establishing their own police departments.

Upon Pitchess' retirement, the Los Angeles County Board of Supervisors designated him as "sheriff emeritus for the rest of his life."

In addition to his law enforcement work, Pitchess served on the Los Angeles County Civil Defense and Disaster Commission during the nuclear crisis in the early 1960s. The position was important because it was at the time of the peak of the cold war nuclear scare.

== Death and legacy ==
Pitchess died at his home in Newport Beach on April 4, 1999, at the age of 87, from heart failure. He is buried in Pacific View Memorial Park in Corona del Mar, California.

His name is well known as a party in a famous California legal case entitled Pitchess v. Superior Court, which entitles a defendant to obtain records of public complaints, using what is now known as a Pitchess motion, about the use of excessive force by police officers. Pitchess' office had claimed that such records were proprietary, and had refused to provide them following a subpoena duces tecum. His petition was ultimately denied by the California Supreme Court in a 7-0 decision.

The Peter J. Pitchess Detention Center in Los Angeles County is named after him.

Police appointments
Preceded by Eugene W. Biscailuz	Los Angeles County Sheriff	Succeeded by Sherman Block
