= Los Angeles County Civil Defense and Disaster Commission =

The Los Angeles County Civil Defense and Disaster Commission is a nine-member panel created in 1961 to prepare for the threat of nuclear war, in addition to the perennial Los Angeles County concerns of flooding, landslides, fires, and earthquakes.

== History ==
The commission was organized in 1961, originally with nine members. The commission reviewed and coordinated all disaster plans for the County of Los Angeles, cities within the county, special districts, and public authorities that were required to submit plans to the State of California, under the provisions of the State Disaster Act and the California Disaster Office. The commission considered and reviewed programs and policies related to disaster preparedness, and promoted training and educational programs in all phases of disasters, working with federal and state disaster and civil defense agencies.

Membership in the commission was by appointment. Los Angeles Mayor Sam Yorty appointed Los Angeles City Council member John Holland, Los Angeles City Civil Defense Director Joseph M. Quinn, and Los Angeles Police Chief William H. Parker. President of the Los Angeles County Division of the League of California Cities, Angelo M. Lacombi appointed Los Angeles City Council member Ralph Harper of the San Fernando Valley, Pasadena, California City Manager Donald C. McMillan, and Monterey Park City Manager Clifford Petri. On October 14, 1961, Los Angeles County Supervisor Ernest E. Debs appointed the final three members, Los Angeles County Disaster Services co-coordinator Roy D. Hoover, Los Angeles County Sheriff Peter J. Pitchess, and businessman Louis Lesser, who developed large-scale projects for the military–industrial complex. Some of his projects served a dual role of urban renewal and civil defense, such as Barrington Plaza, which was both the largest urban renewal project under President John F. Kennedy's Federal Housing Authority program on urban renewal, and was approved as a nuclear fallout shelter. Barrington Plaza was approved as a nuclear fallout shelter a day before Lesser's appointment to the commission, on October 14, 1961.

== Controversy ==
The commission's first program was the subject of controversy. The Los Angeles Times referred to its proposed nuclear fallout shelter plan as being “massive”, ($4,352,672,606 (adjusted for inflation, $404 million in 1961 dollars). The program would pass funds through a member of the commission, raising concerns of a conflict of interest. A complete review was ordered by unanimous vote of the Los Angeles County Board of Supervisors on November 14, 1961. The motion by Los Angeles County Supervisor Burton W. Chace called for the Los Angeles County Chief Administrative Officer L. S. Hollinger, and Los Angeles County Counsel Harold W. Kennedy to prepare a report on all ramifications of the plan within two weeks of November 15, 1961. Supervisor Kenneth Hahn was a staunch advocate of the program, but was away on vacation during the unanimous vote for a review. A voter-approved bond issue was required to raise the money for the proposed program. Supervisor Frank G. Bonelli said a delegation of Los Angeles County Supervisors would go to Washington to consult with President John Fitzgerald Kennedy on the proposal, and to learn what matching funds the federal government would provide. Supervisor Warren M. Dorn was critical of the lack of any chain of command for the fallout shelter program, and said he would not vote to approve the program without a coordination program on all levels of government, plus matching federal funds from the federal government. Dorn proposed investigating making all future community park buildings potential underground fallout shelters, as well as using school gymnasiums and cafeterias. Dorn also proposed a motion to ask all California congressmen to support measures which would require the Agriculture Department to stockpile food supplies adjacent to the Los Angeles Basin for major emergencies. Both motions were approved unanimously. Guns and butter concerns were raised that the money would be better spent assisting the poor. Concerns were raised that the federal government should match funds spent by the County of Los Angeles. Concerns were raised that the commission had the power to determine who would live and who would die in the event of nuclear war, with access to nuclear fallout shelters going to the wealthy or the politically connected. Another concern was that the plans of the commission were unrealistic, for example, the “drop and cover” educational program would do little in the event of a nuclear war.
