= Ed J. Davenport =

American politician (1899–1953)

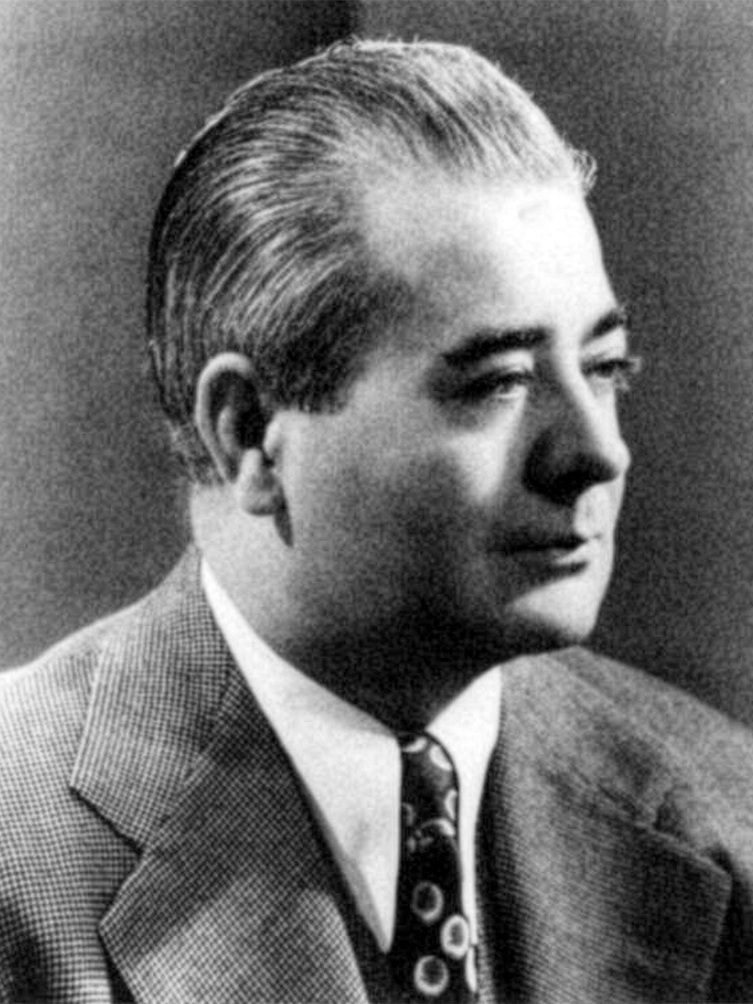
- Davenport in 1947

Member of the Los Angeles City Council from the 12th district
- In office July 1, 1945 – June 24, 1953
- Preceded by: John W. Baumgartner
- Succeeded by: Harriett Davenport

Personal details
- Born: February 9, 1899 Pittsburgh, Pennsylvania, U.S.
- Died: June 24, 1953 (aged 54) Los Angeles, California, U.S.
- Party: Democratic (until 1948); Republican (after 1948)
- Spouse: Harriett Davenport
- Occupation: Politician

Edward J. Davenport (February 9, 1899 – June 24, 1953) was an American politician who served on the Los Angeles City Council for the 12th district from 1945 to 1953. Elected as a liberal Democrat, he became a staunch conservative anti-communist, switching his party to Republican in 1948.

== Personal life ==
Davenport was born February 9, 1899, in Pittsburgh, Pennsylvania, the son of John Wesley Davenport of Fort Hamilton, New York.

He studied business administration at the University of Pittsburgh and law at Southwestern University. In his working life, he was in the advertising business in Upstate New York from 1920 to 1926 and then was general manager of a department store in Utica, New York, from 1926 to 1929. He then became advertising and public relations manager for Frank Knox, the general manager of Hearst Publications, from 1929 to 1932, after which he moved to California and started his own agency. He and Harriett Goodmanson were married in August 1935 in Seattle, Washington. They had no children.

Davenport died in his sleep on June 24, 1953, at the age of 54. In addition to his wife, he left his mother, Margaret Davenport of McKeesport, Pennsylvania, and five siblings, Annamae Osterman, Alice Clarke, Catherine Bast and Harry Davenport, all of McKeesport, and Sister Mary Catherine, a Catholic nun of Ebensburg, Pennsylvania. He was interred in Forest Lawn Memorial Park, Glendale.

== Civic activities ==
Ed Davenport was a member of the American Council on Public Relations and the Elks. He was a Catholic and, for most of his life, a Democrat, until he switched to the Republicans in 1948. During World War II he was coordinator of the War Production Fund of the National Safety Council and was also director of War Chests and Community Chest for city of Glendale.

=== City Council ===
==== Elections ====
Ed Davenport was elected in 1945 to fill the Los Angeles City Council District 12 seat vacated by John W. Baumgartner, who retired. At that time, the district included Bunker Hill and northwest downtown, with the east and north boundaries at Glendale Boulevard and at Sunset Boulevard. He was reelected in every succeeding primary vote thereafter, up to and including 1959. He died six days before he was to start his last term.

==== Positions ====
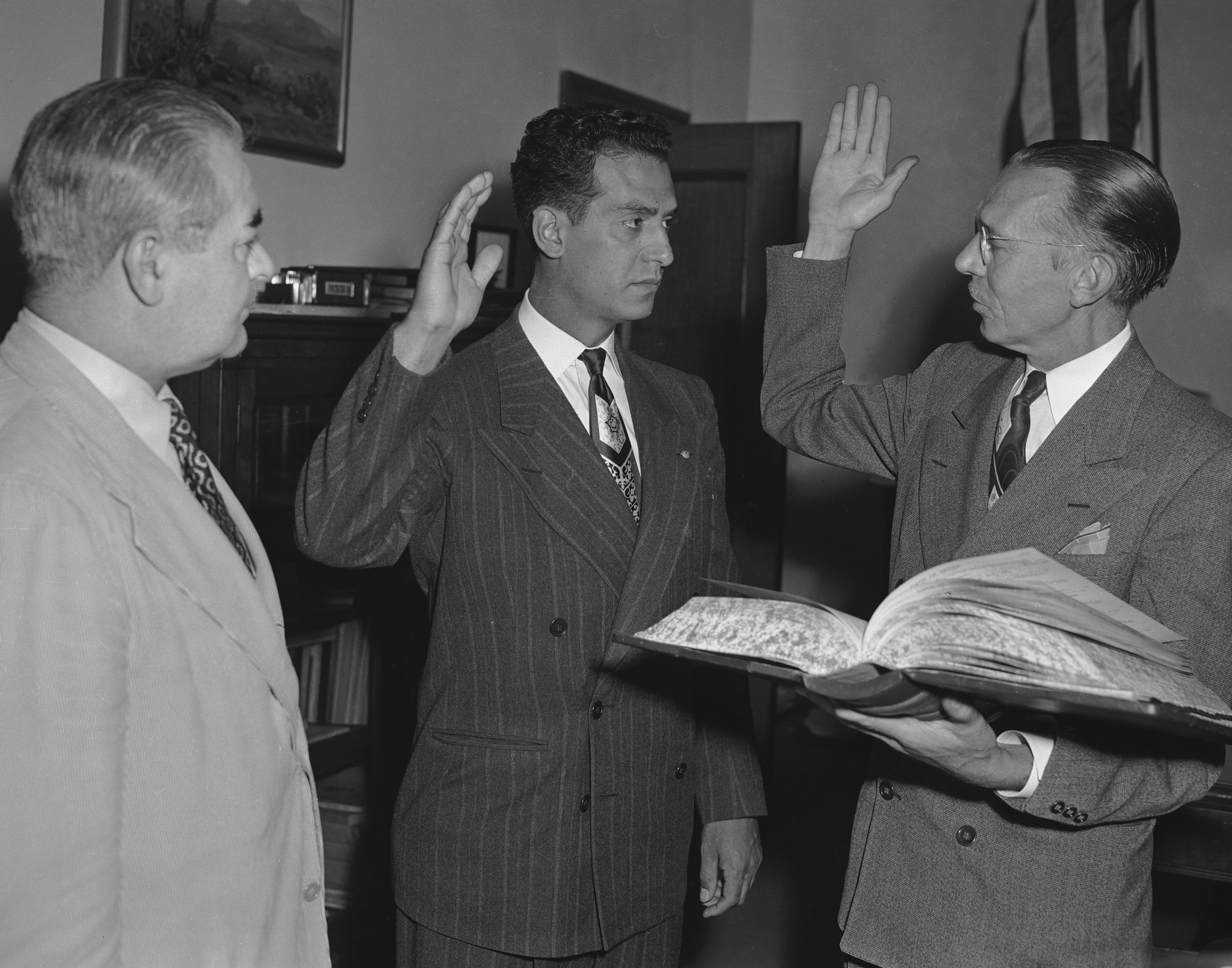
Davenport (far left) watching Edward R. Roybal take oath in 1946.

Ed Davenport was known as a "stormy petrel" of Los Angeles politics and was called "one of the most colorful figures in city legislative history and an active participant in every controversial issue brought before the Council." He was said to have introduced more resolutions, often controversial, than any other council member. He "took a prominent part in enactment of the city employees' loyalty oath program." One of his resolutions would have required "all members of the Communist Party living here" to register with the chief of police. He was "an ardent foe of public housing and of Communism in any form and was an equally ardent champion of a foreign trade zone for the Los Angeles Harbor."

Other positions taken:

1945, Bowron. He refused to attend a meeting called by Mayor Fletcher Bowron with other City Council members because he believed that the press, as well as members of a taxpayers' group, should have been invited. He and the mayor quarreled in public for some ten minutes about the issue.

1945–46, interracial. Davenport originally supported a proposal to establish an interracial committee devoted to the interests of minority groups but finally voted with an 8-6 majority to kill the ordinance, without prejudice. The next year, though, he introduced an ordinance that would make it a misdemeanor for anyone to "write, print or publish, or in any other way aid in the dissemination of any material 'which exposes any religious or racial group to ridicule, contempt or hatred, or which tends to disturb the public peace or endanger life or property.' " It was sent to a committee for study.

1947, Communism. He introduced a resolution stating that "the Communist press has announced that Los Angeles is a key city for concentration of the Communist party and this is borne out by the candidacy of LaRue McCormick, a Communist Party member running as a Communist against Eleanor B. Allen, member of the Board of Education."

1947, oil. Another resolution called for an end to gasoline and oil shipments from Los Angeles Harbor to the Soviet Union "to stop this Russian drain of American resources so vital to our national defense and domestic economy."

1949, landmark. A resolution by Davenport was instrumental in halting the proposed destruction of the historic Lugo Adobe on the Los Angeles Plaza, as planned by the city Board of Public Works. It was later destroyed anyway.

1953, employment. He opposed the establishment of a Fair Employment Practices Commission, which, he said, "does nothing except give an extra tool to the Communists."

1953, campaign literature. One of his last resolutions, which was adopted by the City Council, asked the city attorney to research the law on outlawing "election campaign smear sheets."

Preceded by John W. Baumgartner	Los Angeles City Council; 12th district 1945–53	Succeeded by Harriett Davenport
