= List of online real estate databases =

This is an alphabetical list of online real estate databases.

== Online real estate databases ==
- Assist-2-Sell
- Cyberhomes
- Homes.com
- Housing.com
- ImmoScout24
- Lamudi
- LoopNet
- MyNewPlace
- Naked Apartments
- NeighborhoodScout
- Nestoria
- Nuroa
- PropertyShark
- Realtor.com
- RealtyTrac
- Redfin
- Revaluate
- Showing Suite
- StreetEasy
- Trulia
- UrbanIndo
- Zillow
- ZipRealty
- Zoopla
