= Automated efficiency model =

Mathematical model for real estate

An automated efficiency model (AEM) is a mathematical model that estimates a real estate property’s efficiency (in terms of energy, commuting, etc) by using details specific to the property which are available publicly and/or housing characteristics which are aggregated over a given area such as a zip code. AEMs have some similarities to an automated valuation model (AVM) in terms of concept, advantages and disadvantages.

AEMs calculate specific efficiencies such as location, water, energy or solar efficiency. The Council of Multiple Listing Services defines an AEM as, “any algorithm or scoring model that estimates the [efficiency] of a home without an on-site inspection. They are similar to Automated Valuation Models (AVMs), but are more reliant on public data such as square footage...and estimated energy usage.”

Most AEMs calculate a property’s selected efficiency by analyzing available public information and may also apply proprietary data or formulas, and allow for a user such as a home owner to make additional inputs. Housing characteristics such as age of the home or square footage may be obtained by data providers such as those on this list of online real estate databases or a similar offerings. Estimates of energy usage may be available from published sources such as through the Residential Energy Consumption Survey by the Energy Information Administration.

== Examples of use ==
By design, the AEM score output is provided as a preliminary comparison tool so the score of one property may be compared to other homes, against an average score for the area, etc. Primary users may vary from buyers and sellers to real estate agents and appraisers as they complete relevant comparisons. For example, REColorado, the multiple listing service covering the Denver metro area, presents a UtilityScore widget on homes for sale. Zillow publishes a Sun Number score on the home fact sheet so website visitors can compare the solar energy potential of prospective properties. Trulia has published a report using automated estimates from UtilityScore to present water, natural gas and electric rates into a single price per square foot by zip code.

Beyond usage for consumer preliminary comparisons, usage of AEMs varies by industry. AEMs may also be used by solar installers, home improvement contractors, efficiency inspectors, and mortgage lenders.

In the photovoltaics industry, installers use Sun Number to reduce the soft costs associated with motivating consumers to invest in solar systems and in recording property specifications to create quotes. The U.S. Department of Energy has found that Sun Number eliminates 7–10 days from the quotation process when solar suitability is determined digitally and eliminates the need for an onsite inspection.

AEMs have been used in the mortgage industry to support a niche loan product called a Location Efficient Mortgage (LEM). During underwriting, an AEM such as the H+T Affordability Index is used to calculate the location efficient value

According to National Mortgage Professional Magazine AEMs may one day be incorporated into loan underwriting as well, “Since utilities are as big or bigger part of home expenses than even real estate taxes, we may see [estimated utility usage] begin to be factored into underwriting.”

== Methodology ==
AEMs generate a score for a specific property based on both publicly available housing characteristics about the subject property as well as mathematical modeling. AEMs are technology-driven scores without an onsite inspection or human assessment. For more accurate information unique to a specific property an onsite inspection such as an energy audit is required.

Detailed information on the data accessed to calculate an AEM, the modeling formulas and algorithms are generally not published. A summary of general information is listed in the table below:

AEM	Type of Score	Score	User input allowed?	Location	Methodology	Cross-Published
UtilityScore	Energy, water	1–100 (worst to best)	Yes	United States	Cost prediction based on local utility rates, personal usage habits; home characteristics as provided by Zillow	REcolorado, Attom Data Warehouse (formerly RealtyTrac)
Energy Score	Energy	1-100 (worst to best)	Yes	Australia	Aggregates electricity- and gas-related cost and consumption data	REA Group
Sun Number	Solar	1–100 (worst to best)	Unknown	United States	Aggregates high-resolution aerial data and GIS software to estimate rooftop pitch and orientation; applies algorithms to factor local weather conditions and impact of shade	Zillow
Tendril Home Energy Consumption Score	Energy	1–100 (worst to best)	No	United States	Consumption data based on a physics-based model and Tendril True Home methodology, home characteristics as matched to customer data such as for Realltors Property Resource.	Realtors Property Resource, Redfin
ClearlyEnergy	Energy	Unknown	Unknown	Unknown	Energy costs	Estately
TLC Engine	Energy, water, location	$ of lifestyle (low to high)	Yes	United States	Public and private data sources; 31 factors including mortgage rates, property taxes, estimated utility bills, insurance rates, commuting costs and daycare	NorthstarMLS
Walk Score	Location	1–100 (worst to best)	No	United States, Canada, Australia	“Data sources include Google, Education.com, Open Street Map, the U.S. Census, Localeze, and places added by the Walk Score user community”	Various
H+T Index	Location	$ of housing + transportation (low to high)	No	United States	Public data on neighborhood characteristics and household characteristics; methodology has been peer-reviewed	MSP H+T Calculator, Abogo

== Advantages ==
As shown in the section above, AEMs tend to rely on public information rather than information which is private to the resident such as actual utility bills. Utility bills can vary based on the occupancy and personal property within a structure. The public information used in AEMs is relatively static as it is focused on details of the structure, location and/or mechanical systems and therefore tends to reflect the real property transferred during a real estate transaction.

According to the Council of Multiple Listing Services advantages are, “AEMs provide consumers with a quick comparison of all properties across a specified market. Since most focus on the attached systems and structure, they are only meant to reflect the efficiency of the real property.”

== Disadvantages ==
According to the Council of Multiple Listing Services advantages are, “AEMs are dependent on data used, the assumptions made, and the model methodology. Since models and methodologies differ and no on-site inspections are performed, accuracy may vary among scoring systems.”
