= Naked Apartments =

- Website type: Real estate, Apartments
- Owner: Zillow Group
- Key people: Joe Charat, Jay Signorello, Gabriel Friedman
- Website: www.nakedapartments.com
- Launched: 2010

Naked Apartments is a website-based business that connects apartment renters in New York City, United States, with real estate brokers and landlords. The website provides 'on demand showings' and 'reverse search'. Using the Naked Apartments website, landlords and brokers search for interested renters and send them listings and offers.

In February 2016, Zillow acquired the company for US$13 million.

== History and services ==
NakedApartments.com launched out of beta in March 2010. At that time it provided a reverse search tool, where brokers and landlords compete for renters by sending listings and offers to registered users of the site. Renters could also browse available apartments, which were ranked by an algorithm, and read broker reviews posted from other renters. The company's primary competitor at the time was Craigslist.

Craines New York, a publication of Crain Communications, reported that Naked Apartments had reached profitability in 2011. In January 2012, Naked Apartments created an interactive list, called The Hall of Fame, to help renters choose reliable rental agents. Naked Apartments does not charge the agents who make their list. The list is free for renters to access. In 2013 the site introduced "Showings on Demand", which was at the time the first online on-demand service in real estate. When renters see an apartment on Naked Apartments, they pick a convenient time to see it, and Naked Apartments finds a qualified agent who is available.

== Awards ==
Naked Apartments was nominated for a Webby Award in the Real Estate Category along with Zillow, Trulia, HotPads.com and The New York Times. The company was listed second, after Move (company), as a top Apartment-Hunting Website by Time Out.

== See also ==
- Craigslist
- Zillow
- Rent.com
- MyNewPlace
