= Condodomain =

Web-based real estate brokerage

CondoDomain is one of the first web-based real estate brokerages.

The company specializes in urban properties and condominiums and is claimed to be one of the first nationwide firms to refund commissions back to the consumer.

The companies’ business model is half online and half personal.

== History ==
CondoDomain was founded in 2005 by Anthony Longo as a lead generation business for luxury high-rise condominium developers. In 2008 the company morphed into a licensed real estate broker in Boston, MA. The company is now a licensed real estate broker in 16 cities including: Austin, Baltimore, Boston, Chicago, Dallas, Denver, Ft. Lauderdale, Hoboken, Houston, Los Angeles, Miami, New York City, Philadelphia, San Diego, San Francisco and Washington D.C.

During the first quarter of 2011, CondoDomain.com reached its One Millionth Refund Dollar.

== Funding ==
In late 2005, the company raised $500,000 in private angel funding. In January 2011, the company closed on another round of private angel funding.

== Traditional Real Estate Broker vs. CondoDomain ==
Soon after launching as a real estate broker in 2008 the company gained significant traction in the Boston marketplace, mostly due to its "Cash Back" commission refund program where buyers who worked with CondoDomain would get a significant cash back refund. This sparked a feud with downtown Boston real estate brokers and one even filed a lawsuit to that extent. The suit was dropped shortly afterwards as the plaintiff did not have any right to engage in a lawsuit against CondoDomain.

== See also ==
- National Association of Realtors
- Cyberhomes
- Redfin
- Zillow
- ZipRealty

== Sources ==
- "CondoDomain sued over shift to brokerage by Inman News, Jan. 23, 2009
- "Hub Condo King sues Web start-up co., Jan. 22, 2009 by Boston Herald, Jan. 22, 2008
- "CondoDomain Flat-Fee Brokerage Service Sued Over Brokerage Shift: Choice Choice, Baby" by Dallas Dirt, Jan. 22, 2008
