= Donald Sterling =

American businessman (born 1934)

- Born: Donald Samuel Tokowitz; April 26, 1934 (age 92); Chicago, Illinois, U.S.
- Other name: Donald T. Sterling
- Education: California State University, Los Angeles (BA); Southwestern Law School (JD)
- Occupations: Attorney, businessman
- Known for: Former owner of the San Diego / Los Angeles Clippers
- Spouse: Shelly Sterling (m. 1955)
- Children: 3

Donald T. Sterling (born Donald Samuel Tokowitz, April 26, 1934) is an American attorney and businessman who was the owner of the San Diego/Los Angeles Clippers of the National Basketball Association (NBA) from 1981 to 2014.

In April 2014, Sterling was banned from the NBA for life and fined $2.5 million by the league after private recordings of him making racist comments were made public. NBA commissioner Adam Silver, who announced Sterling's suspension, said he would immediately recommend to the NBA board of governors that Sterling be forced to sell the team. In May, Sterling's wife Shelly reached an agreement for the Sterling Family Trust to sell the Clippers for $2 billion to Steve Ballmer. Sterling contested the agreement in court, but the NBA board of governors approved the sale of the Clippers to Ballmer in August 2014. Sterling settled his lawsuit against the NBA in November 2016 and remains active in Los Angeles real estate.

Sterling's ownership of the Clippers is often criticized, and many consider him one of the worst owners in American sports history.

== Early life ==
Donald Sterling was born Donald Tokowitz on April 26, 1934, in Chicago. His family moved to the Boyle Heights area of Los Angeles when he was two years old. His parents, Susan and Mickey, were Ashkenazi Jewish immigrants. He attended Theodore Roosevelt High School in Los Angeles, where he was on the school's gymnastics team and served as class president; he graduated in 1952. He then attended California State University, Los Angeles (class of 1956) and Southwestern University School of Law (class of 1960) in Los Angeles.

When he was 25, he and his wife Shelly changed their surname to "Sterling", filing a formal petition to do so on December 9, 1959. They cited the difficulty among his peers to pronounce "Tokowitz" and the belief that there would be financial benefits for the change.

== Legal and real estate career ==
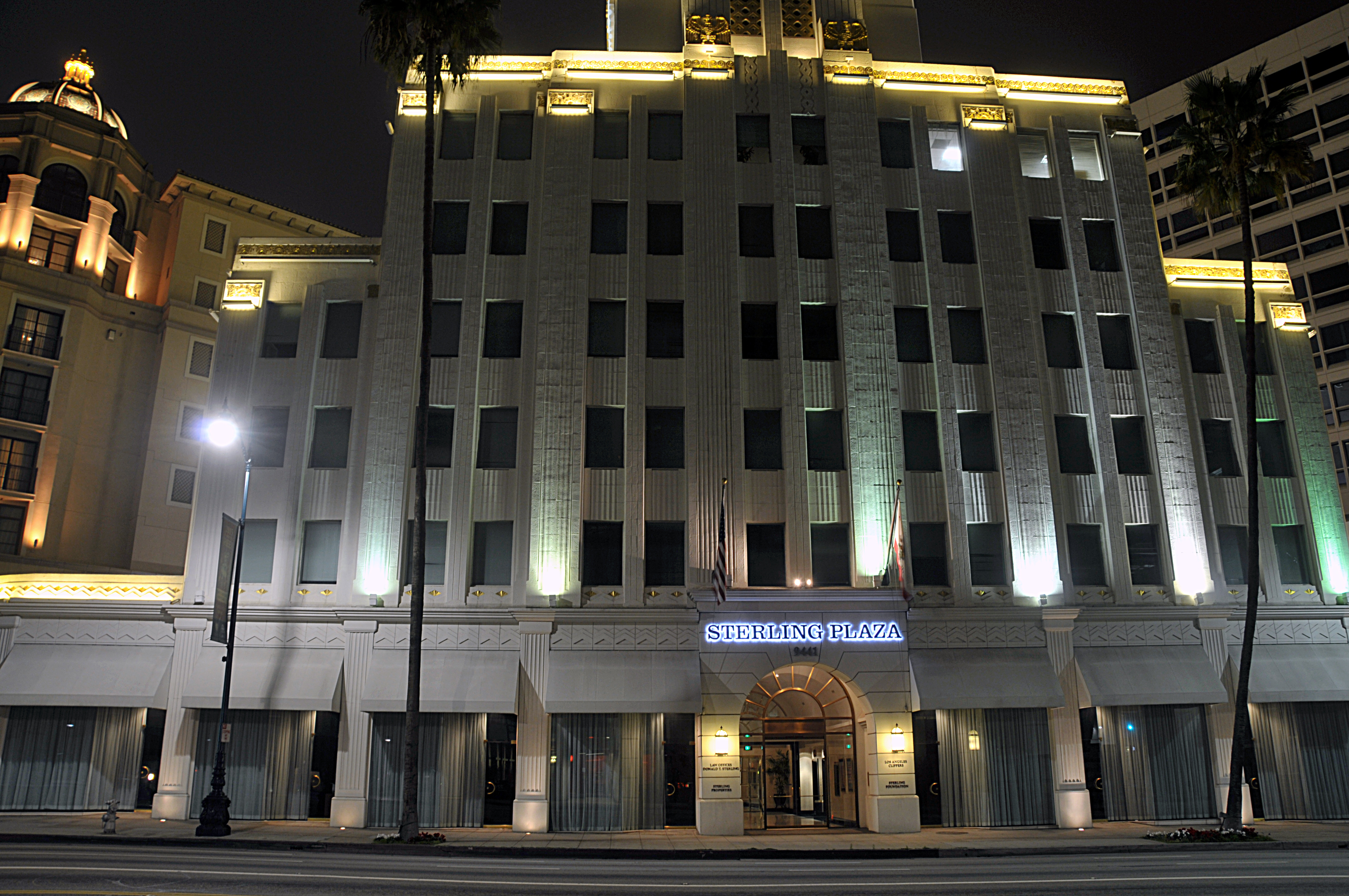
The Sterling Plaza in Beverly Hills, California

In 1961, Sterling started his career as a divorce and personal injury attorney, building an independent practice. His biggest ventures were in real estate, which he began when he purchased a 26-unit apartment building in Beverly Hills.

In the 1960s, Sterling also purchased Lesser Towers, a pair of large apartment buildings in the Westwood area of Los Angeles, and renamed them the Sterling Towers (now the Sterling International Towers). In 1976, he leased the California Bank Building on Wilshire Boulevard in Beverly Hills and renamed it Sterling Plaza. The Art Deco landmark was built in 1930 by MGM cofounder Louis B. Mayer. In 2000, Sports Illustrated senior writer Franz Lidz revealed that Sterling had a 99-year lease with the Mayer estate that required him to pay a relatively small annual fee and 15% of any rental income, which was why Sterling had remained the sole tenant. "With no other tenant," Lidz reported, "the Mayer estate faces another 75 years with virtually no income from its Sterling Plaza property. By sitting and waiting, Sterling may force a fire sale." As of April 2014, he owned 162 properties in Los Angeles.

== NBA ownership ==
Sterling and Los Angeles Lakers majority owner Jerry Buss were each indirectly responsible for the other owning his respective NBA franchise. The first instance came in 1979, when Buss used the money he made from selling a portion of his apartment buildings to Sterling (worth $2.7 million), which covered the remaining balance in purchasing the Lakers, the Kings hockey team, and The Forum arena from Jack Kent Cooke for $67 million. Two years later, Buss suggested that Sterling purchase his own NBA franchise, and Sterling bought the San Diego Clippers for $12.5 million.

At his introductory news conference in San Diego, Sterling vowed to "spend unlimited sums" to build the Clippers into a contender, and he embarked on a county-wide marketing campaign featuring his smiling face on billboards and the backs of buses. The seminal ads read: "My Promise: I will make you proud of the Clippers". Unlike Buss' instant success with the Lakers (including winning an NBA championship in his first season as owner, 1979–80), Sterling and his Clippers struggled through many lackluster seasons, and they did not have their first winning season until the 1991–92 season, 11 years into his ownership. In Sterling's 33 years of owning the Clippers through 2013–14, the Clippers lost 50 or more games 22 times, 60 or more on eight occasions, and 70 games once. Their 9–41 record in the lockout-shortened 1998–99 season projected to another 60-loss season.

The NBA in 1982 fined Sterling $10,000, the largest sum ever levied against an owner at the time, after he commented that he would accept the Clippers finishing in last place in order to draft an impact player like Ralph Sampson. In June 1982, Sterling attempted to move the team to Los Angeles. This prompted an investigation of the Clippers by an NBA committee of six owners. In September, the group recommended that Sterling's ownership be terminated, having found that he was late in paying creditors and players. Days before a league scheduled vote in October to remove Sterling, he agreed to sell the team, and the league sought buyers who would keep the franchise in San Diego. At the suggestion of David Stern, then the league's vice president, Sterling was able to maintain his position as owner, instead handing over operations duties of the franchise to Alan Rothenberg, who became the team's president. By February 1983, Stern called the Clippers a "first-class" franchise, and the ouster of Sterling was no longer pursued.

Encouraged by friend Al Davis' victory over the National Football League in an antitrust lawsuit that allowed him to move his Oakland Raiders to Los Angeles without league approval, Sterling moved the Clippers from San Diego to Los Angeles in 1984, despite again being denied permission from the NBA to do so. The NBA subsequently fined him $25 million. He sued the league for $100 million, but dropped the suit when the league agreed to decrease the fine to $6 million. Sterling was widely criticized for his frugal operation of the Clippers, due in part to a consistent history of losing seasons. The club was long considered the laughingstock of the NBA. The Clippers moved into the Staples Center for the 1999–2000 NBA season, the same place in which the Lakers were becoming perpetual contenders. In the 2005–06 season, eight years removed from their last playoff appearance, they won 47 games and finished 6th in the Western Conference to make the playoffs. This was a record for the most victories in a single season since the franchise moved to California. It was the fourth playoff appearance for the Clippers with Sterling as owner and it was also only the second winning season in his tenure. They beat the Denver Nuggets in the first round for the team's first playoff series win since 1976 before losing to the Phoenix Suns in a seven-game semifinals. In the lockout-shortened 2011–2012 season they made the playoffs with the best winning percentage in their history (.606) with 40 wins in 66 games and they won their first round series against the Memphis Grizzlies, 4–3, before being swept by the San Antonio Spurs, 4–0, in the conference semi-finals. Led by Blake Griffin and Chris Paul, the Clippers posted two more winning campaigns in 2012–13 and 2013–14, setting new franchise records for regular-season wins with 56 and 57, respectively, but won just one playoff series combined.

Sterling rebuffed numerous offers from other cities to relocate the Clippers and was steadfast in his refusal to move the team out of Los Angeles, let alone sell the team. While the team played a few games in Anaheim in the Arrowhead Pond (now the Honda Center) for a few years before the Staples Center opened, he was not willing to move the team there permanently. In later years, he showed an increased willingness to spend. In 2003, Sterling signed Elton Brand to a six-year, $82 million deal, the biggest contract in franchise history. He matched the contract the Utah Jazz offered restricted free agent Corey Maggette: a deal worth $45 million over six years. The Clippers signed higher-priced veteran free agents, such as Cuttino Mobley in 2005, Tim Thomas in 2006, and Los Angeles native Baron Davis in 2008. In another first during the Sterling tenure of Clippers ownership, the team gave a four-year contract extension to head coach Mike Dunleavy Sr., as well as a five-year extension to center Chris Kaman. Both extensions took effect starting in the 2007–08 NBA season.

Under Sterling's ownership, only Dunleavy and Bill Fitch (1994–1998) lasted four seasons or more as Clippers head coach; as of the 2009–10 NBA season, Dunleavy entered his seventh season as Clippers head coach, by far the longest tenure in franchise history, but was relieved of his coaching duties on February 4, 2010. Dunleavy was also the club's general manager, but was fired from that position a month later. The Clippers accused Dunleavy of defrauding the team, and he sued the club for money owed on the remainder of his contract; an arbitrator ordered the Clippers to pay Dunleavy $13 million in 2011. The Clippers also went to court with former head coaches Fitch and Bob Weiss. Weiss, who signed a three-year contract but was fired in 1994 after one season, had to sue to receive money that was still owed him. In 2001, the Clippers sued the 63-year-old Fitch, whom the team had fired in 1998, after they stopped paying him for failing to seek employment to reduce the team's obligation for payment. The suit reached an undisclosed settlement before going to court.

Sterling spent $50 million to build a state-of-the-art practice facility and team headquarters in Los Angeles' Playa Vista mixed-use development neighborhood. This followed the lead of several other NBA franchises, including the Lakers, Sacramento Kings, Cleveland Cavaliers, and Detroit Pistons, in having their own facility dedicated exclusively for team use. The facility was completed and opened in September 2008, in time for the start of the team's training camp. The team previously practiced at a local health club in suburban El Segundo, and before that at Los Angeles Southwest College.

According to Elgin Baylor, who served as a Clippers executive for more than two decades and was named the NBA Executive of the Year in 2006, several players approached him and expressed discomfort with Sterling's presence in the locker room.

Sterling's ownership was viewed critically. ESPN The Magazine in 2009 named the Clippers the worst franchise in professional sports. Uncharacteristic for an owner, Sterling in 2010 heckled players on his own team—with Baron Davis receiving the harshest treatment—while sitting courtside during home games. In late April 2014, following news of racial remarks, Sporting News described Sterling as "one of the worst owners in basketball for decades", while The New York Times and Forbes called him the "worst owner" in sports, and an analyst noted that under Sterling's ownership, from his purchasing the Clippers in 1981 through 2013–14, the Clippers achieved the worst winning percentage in all four major American sports leagues.

=== Racist remarks and lifetime ban ===
Accordingly, effective immediately, I am banning Mr. Sterling for life from any association with the Clippers organization or the NBA. Mr. Sterling may not attend any NBA games or practices, he may not be present at any Clippers facility, and he may not participate in any business or player-personnel decisions involving the team. He will also be barred from attending NBA Board of Governors meetings, or participating in any other league activity. I am also fining Mr. Sterling two-point-five million dollars ($2,500,000), the maximum amount allowed under the NBA Constitution. These funds will be donated to organizations dedicated to anti-discrimination and tolerance efforts, that will be jointed selected by the NBA and its Players Association. As for Mr. Sterling's ownership interest in the Clippers, I will urge the Board of Governors to exercise its authority to force a sale of the team, and will do everything in my power to ensure that that happens.

— NBA Commissioner Adam Silver, CNN's raw coverage of the lifetime ban of Donald Sterling (April 29, 2014)

On April 25, 2014, TMZ Sports released a recording of a conversation between Sterling and his mistress, V. Stiviano (born María Vanessa Perez, also known as Monica Gallegos, Vanessa Perez, and Maria Valdez). In the recording from September 2013, a man confirmed to be Sterling was irritated over a photo Stiviano had posted on Instagram, in which she posed with Basketball Hall of Fame player and Laker great Magic Johnson. Sterling told Stiviano, who herself is part African-American: "It bothers me a lot that you want to broadcast that you're associating with black people," and, "You can sleep with [black people]. You can bring them in, you can do whatever you want," but "the little I ask you is ... not to bring them to my games."

The recording received national media coverage and Sterling retained Newport Beach-based attorney Bobby Samini as his lead counsel in litigation with the NBA, TMZ, and Stiviano.

Clippers president Andy Roeser issued a statement the following day, indicating that Stiviano was being sued by the Sterling family and had told Mr. Sterling that she would "get even" with him. A month earlier, Sterling's wife had sued Stiviano for the return of items she said her husband had given Stiviano, including a $1.8 million Los Angeles duplex, a Ferrari, two Bentleys, a Range Rover, and $200,000 cash.

Sterling's comments affected the NBA, a league with predominantly black players. On April 26, the team held a meeting to discuss the incident. Both coaches and players expressed anger toward the comments, and they briefly raised the possibility of boycotting Game 4 of their series against the Golden State Warriors on April 27 before deciding against it. Instead, players protested Sterling's remarks by wearing their shirts inside-out in order "to obscure any team logo" during their pre-game huddle. On April 28, players of the Miami Heat wore their uniform tops inside-out to show solidarity with the Clippers. LeBron James commented on the situation, "There's no room for Donald Sterling in the NBA." The owner of the Miami Heat, Micky Arison, also called the allegations "appalling, offensive and very sad". Current and former NBA players Kevin Johnson, Kareem Abdul-Jabbar, Magic Johnson, Charles Barkley, Shaquille O'Neal, Kobe Bryant, and Michael Jordan also condemned Sterling's remarks. The Los Angeles chapter of the National Association for the Advancement of Colored People (NAACP) cancelled its plans for the following month to award Sterling for a second time with its lifetime achievement award. President Barack Obama characterized the recording of Sterling as "incredibly offensive racist statements". Chumash Casino, the Clippers' most visible sponsor during the prior four seasons, ended its relationship with the team, as did sponsors CarMax, Virgin America, and others. On April 29, 2014, UCLA announced that it was rejecting a $3 million gift from Sterling.

On April 29, NBA commissioner Adam Silver announced that Sterling had been banned from the league for life and fined $2.5 million, the maximum fine allowed by the NBA constitution. Silver stripped Sterling of virtually all of his authority over the Clippers, and banned him from entering any Clippers facility. He was also banned from attending any NBA games. The punishment was one of the most severe ever imposed on a professional sports team owner. Moreover, Silver stated that he would move to force Sterling to sell the team, based on a willful violation of the rules, which would require the consent of three-quarters, or 22, of the other 29 NBA team owners.

In his first public comments in nearly two weeks after his ban from the NBA, Sterling appeared on CNN with Anderson Cooper on May 11 to apologize, saying he was "not a racist", and ask for forgiveness. He said he was "baited" by Stiviano into making the offensive comments. In the interview, Sterling criticized Magic Johnson's character and his battle with HIV. In response to Sterling, Silver apologized for the NBA to Johnson "that he continues to be dragged into this situation and be degraded by such a malicious and personal attack".

Sterling's wife, Shelly, had co-owned the team with him since 1983, and she had served as one of the team's two alternate governors. While she was not included in the NBA's ban on Sterling, the league stated that "if a controlling owner's interest is terminated by a 3/4 vote, all other team owners' interests are automatically terminated as well". In response to the NBA's decision, Sterling's attorney Bobby Samini called the NBA a "band of hypocrites," citing previous discriminatory conduct by the NBA, and suggested the organization "take a close reflection at their own conduct." The NBA formally charged Sterling with damaging the league with his comments from both the TMZ recording and the CNN interview, and scheduled a hearing to begin on June 3, after which the league could vote to terminate the Sterlings' ownership.

On May 23, Shelly Sterling said her husband had authorized her to negotiate the sale of the team. On May 29, she reached a deal, pending NBA approval, to sell 100% of the Clippers to former Microsoft CEO Steve Ballmer for $2 billion. Shelly also agreed not to sue the NBA and to indemnify the league against other suits related to the case, including any initiated by her husband. The NBA responded by cancelling its hearing to consider stripping the Clippers from the Sterlings.

Sterling disavowed having given his wife authorization to sell the team, denied all charges, and refused to sell the Clippers. He called the penalties "draconian" and referred to the process as a "sham". He then sued the NBA for $1 billion, alleging it had violated both antitrust laws and his constitutional rights. On June 4, 2014, attorney Maxwell Blecher announced that Sterling had decided to drop the lawsuit against the NBA, and had agreed to allow the proposed $2 billion sale of the Clippers to Ballmer. The sale would be approved pending a majority vote of league owners.

On June 9, Blecher said Sterling had withdrawn support for the sale, and would resume the lawsuit. However, Shelly was granted a trial in probate court that began on July 7 to allow her to proceed with the sale as sole trustee; she contended that three doctors reported that Sterling was suffering from Alzheimer's disease and lacked the mental capacity to be a trustee. Closing arguments were scheduled for July 28. The NBA was scheduled to vote on the sale to Ballmer on July 15, the same day the deal was set to expire unless Ballmer granted an extension. On July 23, Sterling sued his wife, the NBA, and Silver for damages, alleging that they violated corporate law and defrauded him in order to sell the team to Ballmer. Sterling also sought an injunction to freeze the sale. On July 28, the probate court ruled in Shelly's favor, and granted her request for an order to permit the sale to be completed regardless of any intervention by an appellate court. Ballmer's $2 billion purchase of the team closed on August 12, and Shelly received the titles "Clippers Number One Fan" and "owner emeritus" as part of the sale agreement. As of April 2015, half of the $2 billion paid by Ballmer was held in an escrow account controlled by the NBA pending the conclusion of Sterling's lawsuit over the sale of the team.

U.S. District Judge Fernando M. Olguin dismissed Sterling's 2014 lawsuit over the sale of the team in March 2016. The judge assailed it as "plainly insufficient" and "clearly implausible." Sterling appealed the decision, but his attorneys did not file an opening brief by the deadline. The matter concluded with a three-page motion to voluntarily dismiss the case.

In 2017, a judge ruled that two law firms could move forward with their lawsuit to collect more than $270,000 in legal fees allegedly owed by Donald and Shelly Sterling, stemming from the 2014 probate action that cleared the way for the sale of the Clippers.

== Discrimination lawsuits ==
In February 2003, the Housing Rights Center of Los Angeles (HRC) filed a housing discrimination case against Sterling on behalf of 18 tenants. The lawsuit featured several racist statements allegedly made by Sterling to employees, such as that "black people smell and attract vermin" and "Mexicans just sit around and smoke and drink all day", as well as Sterling's alleged intent to rent only to Korean tenants because "they will pay the rent and live in whatever conditions I give them".

In 2006, the U.S. Department of Justice sued Sterling for housing discrimination for using race as a factor in filling some of his apartment buildings. The suit charged that Sterling refused to rent to non-Koreans in the Koreatown neighborhood and to African Americans in Beverly Hills. In November 2009, ESPN reported that Sterling agreed to pay a fine of $2.7 million to settle the lawsuit.

In February 2009, the Clippers were sued in L.A. Superior Court by former longtime Clippers executive Elgin Baylor for wrongful termination and employment discrimination on the basis of age and race. The lawsuit alleged that co-defendant Sterling told Baylor that he wanted to fill his team with "poor black boys from the South and a white head coach". The suit also alleged that Mike Dunleavy Sr., the head coach, "was given a four-year, $22-million contract ... [as he was a] Caucasian" while Baylor's salary had "been frozen at a comparatively paltry $350,000 since 2003". Baylor later dropped the race accusation. The case went to trial in March 2011, with the jury ruling unanimously in favor of the Clippers and Sterling.

== Sexual harassment lawsuits ==
In 1996, Christine Jasky, a property management consultant for Sterling who also did work for the Clippers, sued Sterling for sexual harassment, claiming she quit her job after he repeatedly offered her money for sex, and asked her to recruit sexual partners for him. Sterling countersued, and the two eventually reached a confidential settlement in 1998.

Sumner Davenport, a property supervisor for Sterling who was fired in 2002, sued him in 2003 for sexual harassment for "unwanted and offensive physical conduct". She lost the case at a jury trial two years later. Court documents indicate that Davenport was a property supervisor based in Sterling's Beverly Hills office, with the responsibilities of overseeing several of his apartment buildings. In her case, she asserted she was fired for her complaints against and refusing to comply with his racially discriminating and abusive behavior against tenants, his illegal eviction process, as well as his offensive physical conduct against her. Court records indicate Sterling's organization denies firing her.

== Personal life ==
In 1955, Sterling married Rochelle ("Shelly") Stein, with whom he had three children. His son-in-law, Eric Miller, served as the Clippers' director of basketball administration, voluntarily leaving after Sterling sold the team.

Donald Sterling had an extra-marital relationship with a woman named Alexandra Castro. Seeking the return of a house she was living in, Sterling sued her in 2003 after their relationship ended. Castro, in 1999, had signed a contract that gave Sterling protection from her seeking palimony, which divides assets between unmarried couples. Their agreement read that Sterling "is happily married, has a family and has no intention of engaging in any activity inconsistent with his domestic relationship". In the proceedings, Castro stated that Sterling consulted her on Clippers personnel decisions. Sterling and Castro reached a confidential settlement out of court in 2004.

Sterling and Shelly became estranged at the end of 2012, when he moved to a mansion in Beverly Hills, California, after she kicked him out of their beach house in Malibu, California, following a family dispute during which he was arguing with a mistress on the phone. A week later, Sterling's son Scott was found dead on New Year's Eve, having died of an accidental narcotic drug overdose at the age of 32.

On August 5, 2015, Sterling's attorney Bobby Samini confirmed to KABC-TV that Sterling filed for divorce from Shelly. In March 2016, Samini informed the Los Angeles Times that "notwithstanding all the difficult events of the last two years, the Sterlings have resolved their differences" and decided not to proceed with their divorce.

=== Health ===
In 2012, Sterling began treatment for prostate cancer. By May 2014, according to multiple doctors Sterling was in the early stages of Alzheimer's disease. He was deemed mentally unfit to continue to lead the financial affairs of the Sterling Family Trust, clearing the way for his wife Shelly to sell the Los Angeles Clippers on his behalf despite his protests.

=== Miniseries ===
Sterling is portrayed by Ed O'Neill in the 2024 FX miniseries Clipped.

== See also ==
- List of people banned or suspended by the NBA

Sporting positions
Preceded by Irv Levin	San Diego/Los Angeles Clippers principal owner 1981–2014	Succeeded by Steve Ballmer
