= Hot pad =

Hot pad may refer to:

- Fabric squares that can be used as a trivet or oven mitt
- Heating pad
- HotPads, a housing marketplace
