= Barrington Plaza =

Apartment complex in Los Angeles, California, United States

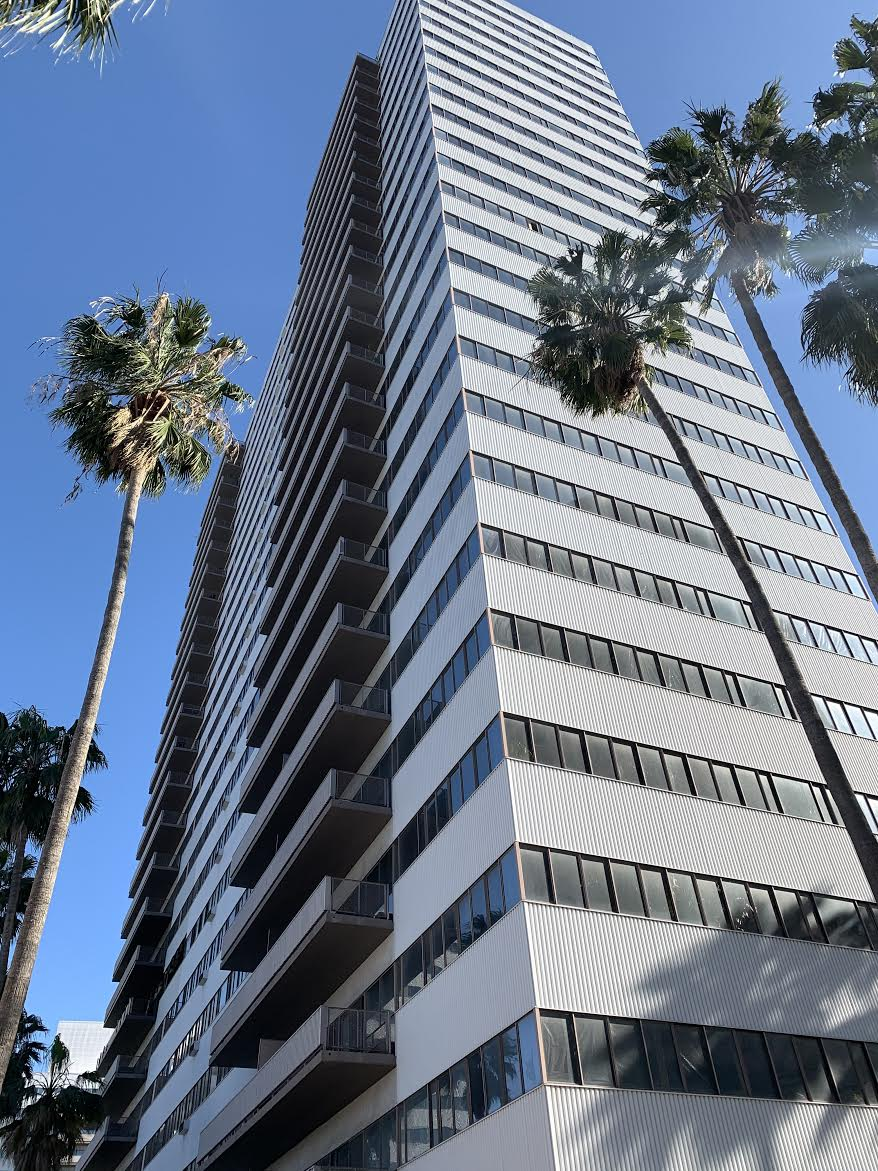
- Interactive map of the Barrington Plaza area

General information
- Location: 11740 Wilshire Boulevard, Los Angeles, United States
- Coordinates: 34°02′56″N 118°27′37″W
- Construction started: 1958
- Completed: 1962

Website
- https://www.douglasemmett.com/barrington-plaza

Barrington Plaza is an apartment complex in Los Angeles, California, located at 11740 Wilshire Boulevard in Sawtelle. At the time of its completion, in 1962, it was described as the largest privately built apartment development in the western United States.

== Design ==
As originally constructed, the plaza consisted of three high-rise buildings which contained 712 apartments. It also included retail and restaurant space, a 330,000-square-foot (31,000 m^{2}) parking garage and a recreational building.

It was designated a fallout shelter, with 40,000-square-foot (3,700 m^{2}) of its garage space and hallways being expected to be able to shelter ten times the resident population.

It was both the largest, and the tallest, privately built apartment complex west of Chicago.

== History ==
Planning for Barrington Plaza began in 1958, when it was initially envisaged to cost $14 million. It was originally conceived and developed by the B.C. Deane Company, based in Van Nuys, and designed by architect Phillip Daniel of DMJM, which later became AECOM. Louis Lesser Enterprises were brought in as partners at the beginning of 1959, subsequently becoming the sole sponsor and buying out Deane in June 1961. Construction started in 1960; it was completed in 1962 and cost about $20 million. A year after completion, around 50% of the units had been sold.

In 1961, Barrington Plaza and its developer, Ben Deane, were selected for an award by the National Association of Home Builders.

The original application for a $14 million Federal Housing Administration loan was described as the largest single application for an insurance commitment under the urban renewal program ever filed in the United States; the actual initial loan was $15.2 million towards the end of 1959. This was reported to have increased to $16.7 million on completion in 1962, and then to $18.6 by the end of Louis Lesser Enterprises' ownership in 1965. In that year, Barrington Plaza was sold to a group from Ohio. In 1966, following foreclosure on the loan after it reached $21 million, the US Senate Permanent Subcommittee on Investigations held hearings into investments secured by the FHA, with Barrington Plaza being the first they addressed.

In 1998, the property was purchased by Douglas Emmett, Inc.

On January 29, 2020, a multiple alarm fire occurred at 8:30 am at Barrington Plaza causing 11 reported injuries and extensive damage to the 6th floor. Some residents were rescued by helicopter from the roof. Eight floors of the building were red-tagged at that time, barring occupancy.

== Renovation and eviction of current residents ==
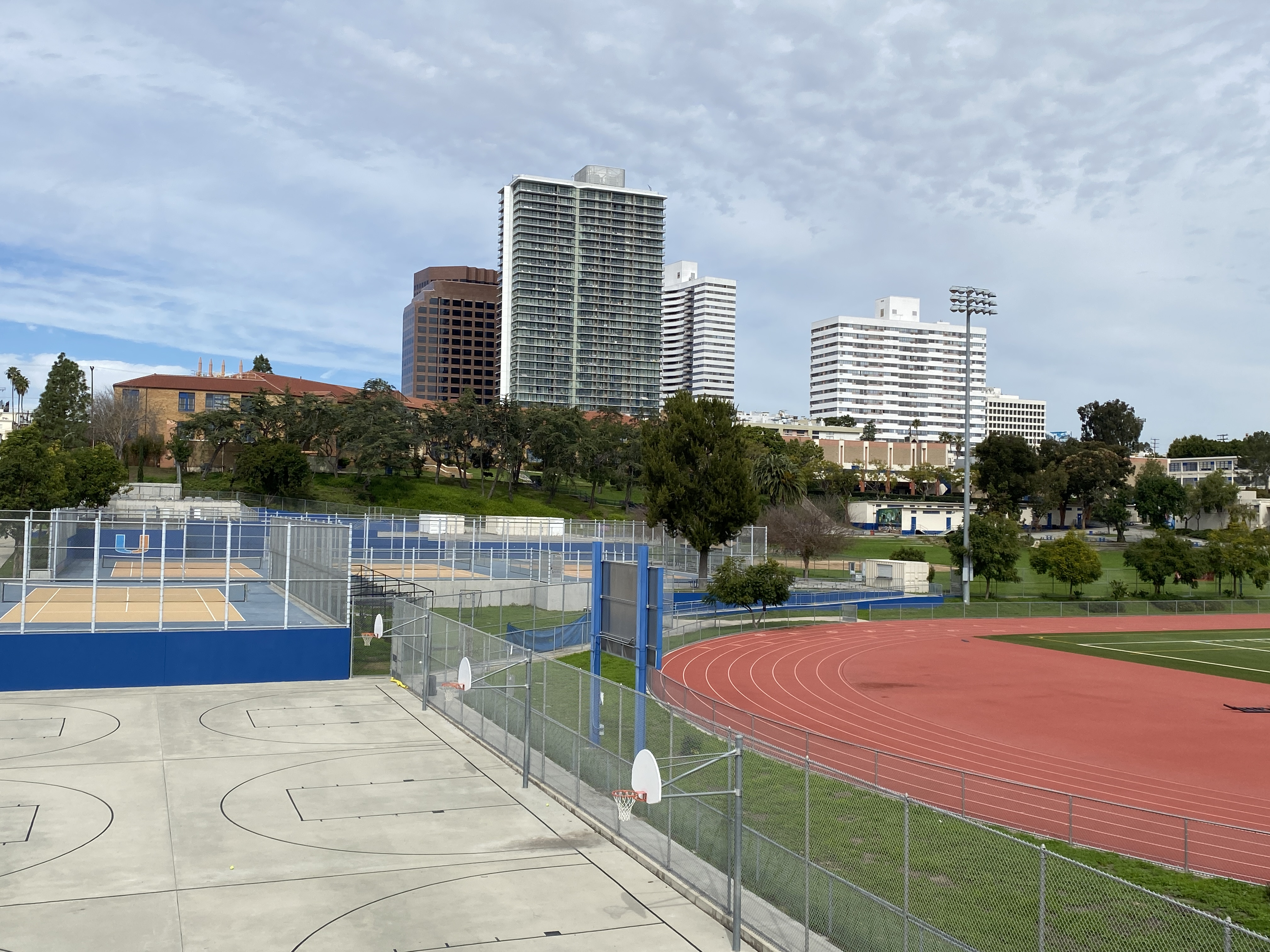
University High School campus with Barrington Plaza and other Wilshire Blvd. towers

On May 8, 2023, the owners of Barrington Plaza announced the closure of the complex to install fire sprinklers, which were not required when the buildings were constructed, and make other changes to upgrade and modernize the building. The renovations were to cost $300,000,000 and take years to complete. After the fire, there are 577 units in the complex. All residents were scheduled to be evicted by September 5, however residents over 62 or disabled were allowed to stay for another eight months. The owners claim that the properties would not be returned to the rental market afterward, under the Ellis Act. The eviction of these residents is considered one of the largest mass evictions in recent Los Angeles history.

== Legal Case ==
In June 2023, tenants of Barrington Plaza formed the "Barrington Plaza Tenants Association" and filed a legal case against the Santa Monica-based real estate investment trust, Douglas Emmett, Inc., alleging violations of the California Ellis Act. The Ellis Act permits landlords to vacate their buildings if they intend to permanently withdraw from the rental business. Douglas Emmett, Inc. had planned to evict residents from 712 rent-controlled units to install fire sprinklers and carry out renovation.

On June 13, 2024, Superior Court Judge H. Jay Ford III tentatively ruled in favor of the tenants. The ruling stated that Douglas Emmett's intention to vacate the building for renovations, with plans to re-rent the units at higher rates afterward, did not align with the Ellis Act's stipulations. The judge concluded that the landlord had no intention of permanently exiting the rental business, as they planned to continue renting the apartments after completing the refurbishments.

Judge Ford wrote, “The court concludes [the landlord’s] intent to temporarily withdraw Barrington Plaza from the rental market with the present intent to return it to the rental market after the renovations are completed is inconsistent with an intent to go out of the rental business under the Ellis Act.”

On July 12, 2024, Judge Ford finalized the ruling in the tenants' favor. The decision determined that Douglas Emmett, Inc. had misused the Ellis Act, leading to the illegal eviction of 470 units. At the time of the ruling, approximately 100 units remained occupied, with the remaining tenants identifying themselves as "The Holdouts." The ruling allows these tenants to maintain their residency at Barrington Plaza while requiring the landlords to implement a Tenant Habitability Plan (THP) for the remaining tenants during renovations.

In August 2024, Douglas Emmett Inc., filed an appeal against the court's decision. As of January 2025, the appeal remains pending.
