= Pete Flint =

British businessman (born 1974)

Pete Flint OBE
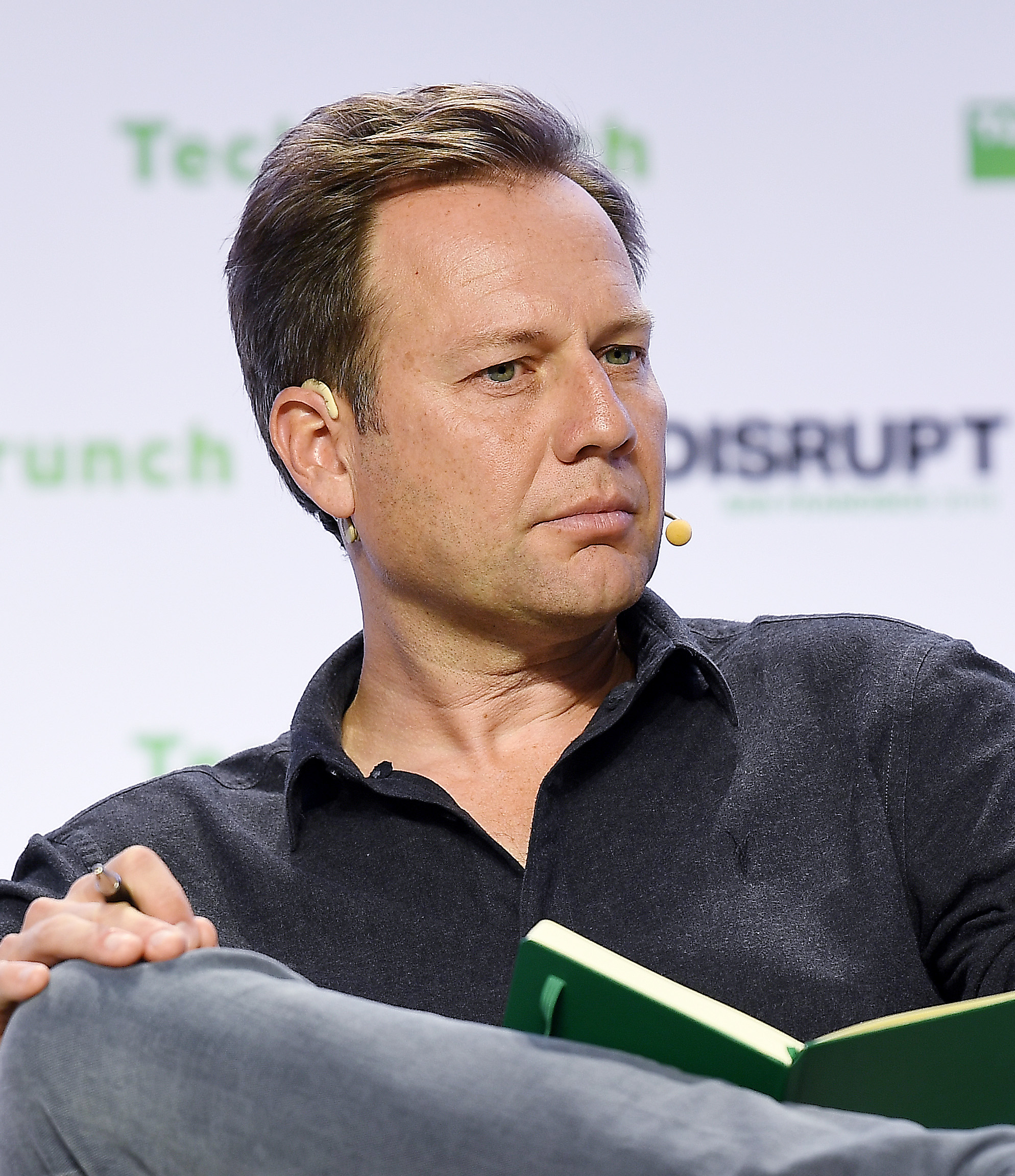
- Flint in 2019
- Born: 25 July 1974 (age 52); England
- Education: University of Oxford, Stanford University
- Occupations: Entrepreneur, internet executive, investor
- Employer(s): Managing partner at NFX, formerly board of directors at Zillow
- Known for: Most successful British entrepreneur in SF Bay Area; founding two billion dollar businesses
- Children: 2
- Website: nfx.com

Pete Flint OBE (born 25 July 1974) is a British Internet entrepreneur and investor based in San Francisco. He is the founder and former chairman and CEO of Trulia. Formerly, he was part of the founding team at lastminute.com. He is currently a managing partner at NFX, an early stage venture capital fund which he co-founded.

== Education and early career ==
Flint attended Chigwell School, earned his bachelor's degree and master's in physics from Oxford University and an MBA from the Stanford Graduate School of Business.

Shortly after graduating from Oxford University, Flint joined Brent Hoberman and Martha Lane Fox to start lastminute.com. He had previously worked alongside Hoberman at LineOne, a joint venture between New International and British Telecom, where he worked for less than a year.

Flint spent five years at lastminute.com, helping to scale the company from a business plan to a public company with 2,000 employees and operations in 11 countries. Flint left lastminute.com to attend Stanford Graduate School of Business in 2003. lastminute.com was then acquired by Sabre Group for $1.1 billion in cash in 2005.

== Trulia ==
While looking for off campus housing in 2004, between the first and second year of his MBA course at Stanford, Flint conceived of Trulia. He observed that the number of consumers researching real estate was growing rapidly, yet all the major websites in the category were not focused on delivering a compelling consumer experience. These websites also failed to provide compelling advertising products because they did not tap into the billions of dollars being spent on advertising in the real-estate newspaper classifieds. Flint wrote the original business plan while at Stanford. Flint recruited a team of Stanford students to turn Flint's concept into a company. Of the original students that worked on the project, Sami Inkinen joined Flint to incorporate the company in June 2005.

Flint scaled Trulia to become one of the leading online real estate companies in the US. He raised venture Capital from Accel Partners and Sequoia Capital, and took the company public with an initial public offering on the New York Stock Exchange in September 2012. In July 2014, Zillow agreed to acquire Trulia in a stock deal initially valued at $3.5 billion. The acquisition closed in February 2015, when it was valued at $2.5 billion, and Flint joined the Zillow Group board. His term as a director expired in June 2017.

== Investor ==
Flint has been an active angel investor and advisor to consumer Internet and network effect businesses. In December 2016 it was announced that he joined NFX as a managing partner. NFX is an early stage venture capital fund based in the San Francisco Bay Area with a focus on network effect businesses.

== Recognition ==
A frequent speaker at technology and entrepreneurship conferences, Flint is featured regularly on CNBC, FOX, Bloomberg, The Wall Street Journal, and The New York Times. He also is a guest lecturer at Stanford's Graduate School of Business.

In 2014, Flint was named Northern California EY entrepreneur of the year. He has also been named one of Fortune magazine's top tech disruptors, most admired CEO in the San Francisco Bay Area according to the San Francisco Business Times, and one of Forbes magazine's most powerful CEOs under 40. Flint was named one of the 100 most influential people in real estate by Inman magazine in 2013 and one of the most powerful people in real estate in Swanepoel power 200. In 2016, Flint was named a Henry Crown Fellow at the Aspen Institute.

Flint was awarded an OBE for services to entrepreneurship in the 2021 Queen's Birthday Honours list.

== Personal life ==
Flint has two children. His brother, Richard, was the former CEO of Sky Betting & Gaming.
