= Rich Barton =

American businessman

Richard Barton
- Born: June 2, 1967 (age 59)
- Occupation: Co-executive chairman of Zillow Group
- Known for: Founder of Expedia, Founder of Zillow, Founder of Glassdoor

Richard Barton (born June 2, 1967) is an American internet entrepreneur who is the co-executive chairman and a former two-time chief executive officer of Zillow Group, a company he co-founded in 2006. Barton founded online travel company (and Microsoft spinoff) Expedia, Inc., real-estate internet company Zillow, and job search engine and career community Glassdoor. He also founded the online travel photography sharing website and app Trover, which was acquired by Expedia in 2016. Barton was also a venture partner at Benchmark, and is on the board of directors for Netflix, Avvo, Nextdoor, and Artsy. He serves on the Stanford University Board of Trustees.

In 2002, he was named as one of the top 10 innovators under 35 by MIT Technology Review. In April 2012, he was named to Barack Obama's Presidential Ambassadors for Continental Entrepreneurship.

== Early life ==
Barton, raised in New Canaan, Connecticut, is the son of a teacher and mechanical engineer. He graduated from Stanford University in 1989 with a degree in engineering. He first worked for Alliance Consulting Group, and in 1991, began working for Microsoft as product manager for MS-DOS 5.0.

Barton's forefathers, John Barton and his son Horace, were inducted into the 1999 South Dakota Tennis Hall of Fame.

== Entrepreneurship ==
Barton founded Expedia within Microsoft in 1994. In 1994, Microsoft was planning to build a travel guidebook on a CD-ROM. Barton, who was familiar with text-based internet services of the time, had come across an online service hosted on Prodigy designed for travel agents working from home. He pitched the idea of an online travel booking service to Bill Gates, Steve Ballmer, and Nathan Myhrvold. Gates, Ballmer, and Myhrvold gave Barton permission to move forward with the project, which debuted on the web as Expedia in 1996. Barton served as CEO through Expedia's initial public offering in 1999, and stayed in the position until 2003, after the company was acquired for $3.6 billion.

After a year-long break in Italy from the business community, Barton returned to Seattle in 2004, and began working toward the launch of Zillow with Lloyd Frink, another Expedia and Microsoft alumnus. Barton and Frink did not reveal much about the company prior to its launch.

In February 2020, Barton became a billionaire according to Forbes, after reporting strong earnings at Zillow. He was CEO of the company from its founding until 2010, returned to the position in 2019, and transitioned to the role of co-executive chairman in August 2024.
