= Where.com =

Former American media company

Where, Inc.
- Type: Private, venture-backed
- Industry: Mobile GPS application development
- Founded: 2004; 22 years ago
- Headquarters: Boston, Massachusetts
- Key people: Walt Doyle, CEO, David Chang COO
- Website: www.where.com

Where, Inc. was a location-based media company in North America. Their main products were the WHERE consumer application and WHERE Ads, a hyper-local ad network that connected merchants with local audiences. PayPal announced its acquisition of Where, Inc. in 2011 for $135 million.

== History ==
Where, Inc. was founded in 2004 under the name uLocate Communications, Inc. by partners, Geoff Palmer, Frank Schroth, and Alan Phillips. uLocate spent its early days creating family tracking services as well as building location-based applications for companies such as MapQuest and Helio. In 2007, WHERE launched as a location-based mobile service for consumers.

WHERE provides hyper-local information and user generated content about weather, news, movies, restaurant and business reviews, cheap gas, coupons and offers, traffic, etc. Brands such as Starbucks, Yellow Pages and Zipcar use WHERE to reach local audiences by providing data for various features within WHERE. For example, a Starbucks feature lets users search for and find directions to the Starbucks nearest their current location. In 2010, the company grew to over 50 people, moving into larger facilities in Boston. During this year, it launched the Placebook feature, which Facebook contested due to its last syllable of "book".

The company was venture-backed by Kodiak Venture Partners, Grand Banks Capital and Venrock and based in Boston. Prior to its acquisition by eBay in 2011, several industry experts sat on its board including Craig Forman and Jim Bankoff, CEO of Vox Media.

== Products ==
=== Where.com ===
The consumer site Where.com launched in March 2010. The Website is a local search and recommendation portal that allows people to find local events, read reviews and other business information, and write their own reviews. On Where.com, people can also create their own user accounts or use their current WHERE mobile application account information to build a personal profile.

=== WHERE Ads ===
WHERE Ads is a hyper-local ad network that localizes traditional advertising techniques with improved performance for better results. Ads engage consumers through location relevance, design optimizing, and delivery format flexibility. In May 2012, WHERE Ads became PayPal Media Network (PPMN).

=== Patents ===
The firm possesses several patents including one for geo-fencing location technology and one for auto-snap location technology.

=== Availability ===
WHERE is available in North America and can be downloaded for a monthly fee from the Android Market, BlackBerry App World, iOS App Store, and Palm App Catalog. WHERE is also available from the AT&T MEdia Mall, T-Mobile web2go, and VZW V Cast Apps.

Wireless carriers — AT&T, Boost Mobile, Helio, MetroPCS, Sprint, Verizon Wireless, Virgin

Mobile smartphone devices — Android, BlackBerry, iPhone, Palm, Windows Phone 7

== PayPal/eBay acquisition ==
=== Management team ===
PayPal acquired Where.com in 2011. At the time, the management consisted of the following:

- Walt Doyle, CEO
- Jerry King, COO
- Ivan Mitrovic, CTO
- Mok Oh, Chief Innovation Officer
- David Chang, VP, Product
- Dan Gilmartin, VP, Marketing
- Joshua Summers, VP, Ad Operations
- Nataly Kogan, VP, Consumer Experience
- Ron Braunfeld, VP of Business Development
- Doug Hurd, VP of Business Development, Carrier & OEM
- Niall Hawkins, VP of Finance
- Arik Keller, Senior Director, Merchant Services
- Jim Caralis, Director, Consumer Product
- Craig Forman, Executive Chairman

=== Mergers & acquisition comparables ===
In the mobile industry, there have been several notable acquisitions of Boston area startups by larger technology companies:

- VeriSign's acquisition of m-Qube for $250M in 2006
- AOL's acquisition of Third Screen Media for $107M in 2007
- Nokia's acquisition of Enpocket in 2007
- Apple's acquisition of Quattro Wireless for $275M in 2010
- Twitter's acquisition of Crashlytics for $100M in 2013
- Millennial Media's acquisition of Jumptap for $225M in 2013
- Millennial Media's acquisition of Nexage for $108M in 2014

=== Post-acquisition ===
Unlike many other acquisitions in the mobile industry, WHERE continued to grow its Boston-based presence after its acquisition. In January 2012, PayPal President Scott Thompson, local executives Walt Doyle, and David Chang met with Massachusetts Governor Deval Patrick to discuss an expansion of California-based PayPal into Boston. After exploring nearly a dozen potential new office sites in Boston, PayPal selected One International Place as its new location for its Boston headquarters.

In 2013, the eBay Boston office houses several operating entities including PayPal, StubHub, and Start Tank.

== Start Tank ==
The Start Tank is a business incubator hosted by PayPal, which offers free co-working space for early-stage startups.

=== Inception ===
Start Tank originated in Boston and expanded to Europe and Asia. With 20 startups, representing over 80 people, Start Tank Boston is unique in its size—one of the largest facilities in Massachusetts that has been dedicated to startups by a corporate entity. There are several similar efforts at eBay including Friends of eBay in New York and PayPal Startup Blueprint, and PayPal incubator in Chennai. These incubators were part of a broader growing trend of business incubators and seed accelerators sponsored by corporate entities and technology companies.

The Start Tank was officially unveiled during the PayPal Boston launch event with Boston Mayor Thomas Menino and Secretary Greg Bialecki in February 2013. The first class of startups consisted of 15 companies based in the Boston area. The second class started in September 2013 and consisted of 22 startups. A number of these startups gained market traction, raised funds of their own, and soon graduated from the program.

=== Expansion ===
The Start Tank gained greater visibility in the Boston area, and by time the third class moved in during March 2014, the program became more selective, accepting only 14 out of 80 applications. It was later named as one of Boston Globe's Game Changers. In summer 2014, the program partnered with The Ad Club to add events such as the Brand-a-thon to engage with the startup ecosystem and expanded globally to London and Chennai. Later that year, the Start Tank program became more competitive, accepting 11% of its applicants in its fourth class. At this time, Start Tank was nominated as a 50 on Fire finalist. In 2016, the program expanded to Singapore.

=== Founder ===
The Start Tank was founded by PayPal executive David Chang, who was named to Boston Business Journal's annual Power 50 List of influential Bostonians after its creation. In 2015, as part of the corporate separation of PayPal from eBay, approximately one-third of the staff in the PayPal Boston office was eliminated, leaving the future of Start Tank uncertain. It was later revealed that the Boston-based entity was split off and was acquired by MassChallenge.
