= StreetEasy =

Website containing real estate information

- Industry: Real estate
- Genre: Technology
- Founded: 2006; 20 years ago in New York City, United States
- Founder: Michael Smith; Sebastian Delmont; Doug Chertok; Nataly Kogan
- Headquarters: 1250 Broadway, New York, NY, USA
- Key people: Caroline Burton; (VP & GM, StreetEasy); Alireza Farhoush; (VP Engineering & Technology, StreetEasy); Susan Daimler; (President, Zillow)
- Services: Real Estate
- Number of employees: 150
- Parent: Zillow
- Website: streeteasy.com

StreetEasy is a technology company founded in 2006 that provides information on real estate listings in the New York metropolitan area.

== History ==
The company was founded by Michael Smith, Sebastian Delmont, Doug Chertok, and Nataly Kogan in 2005 as NMD Interactive. The company's founders had no traditional experience in the real estate sector. The StreetEasy.com website launched in 2006. The company raised an initial $400,000 from investors including Global Strategy Group, Southpaw Capital Management and Sig Zises. The company received an additional $2.5 million investment from FA Technology Ventures in 2006.

The company became popular by aggregating real estate listings into a single location. Listings were published with price changes and information like days the property had been on the market. This information was previously unavailable to the public and by 2008 the company's website was averaging 4.5 million page views per month.

In 2013, StreetEasy was acquired by Zillow for $50 million with the understanding the website would be run independent of Zillow. Within a year most of the original senior staff had left and CEO Michael Smith was replaced with Zillow's Susan Daimler.

The company has won Webby awards for Best Use of GPS or Location Technology People's Voice in 2015 and Best App & Software in the Real Estate category in 2016 and 2017. In 2018, the company won a Shorty Award for Best Social Media in the Real Estate category.

In 2017 the company launched a new paid listing model and began charging real estate brokers $3 a day for rental listings. In 2021, the company reported 180 million visits to its website and app. It is estimated that eighty percent of people searching for a home in New York City used StreetEasy or one of the affiliated Zillow Group websites. By 2022, the listing fee was raised to $6 a day for rental listings, though fees were reduced throughout the pandemic. The company also charges fees for other features, such as StreetEasy Experts, Agent Spotlight and Featured Listings.

== Software ==
StreetEasy provides access to real estate listing information and data via their website and mobile application. Real estate listings are often accompanied by building information including number of total units, current and past units for sale and for rent, building amenities and public permit information. Additionally, information on nearby public transportation and schools is provided alongside listing information about the property.

The company also releases monthly market data reports on their website and several yearly lists.

In 2022 the company released StreetScape, an augmented reality feature on IOS that allows displays information on buildings and available units for sale and rent.
