= Sterling Plaza =

Historic building in Beverly Hills, California

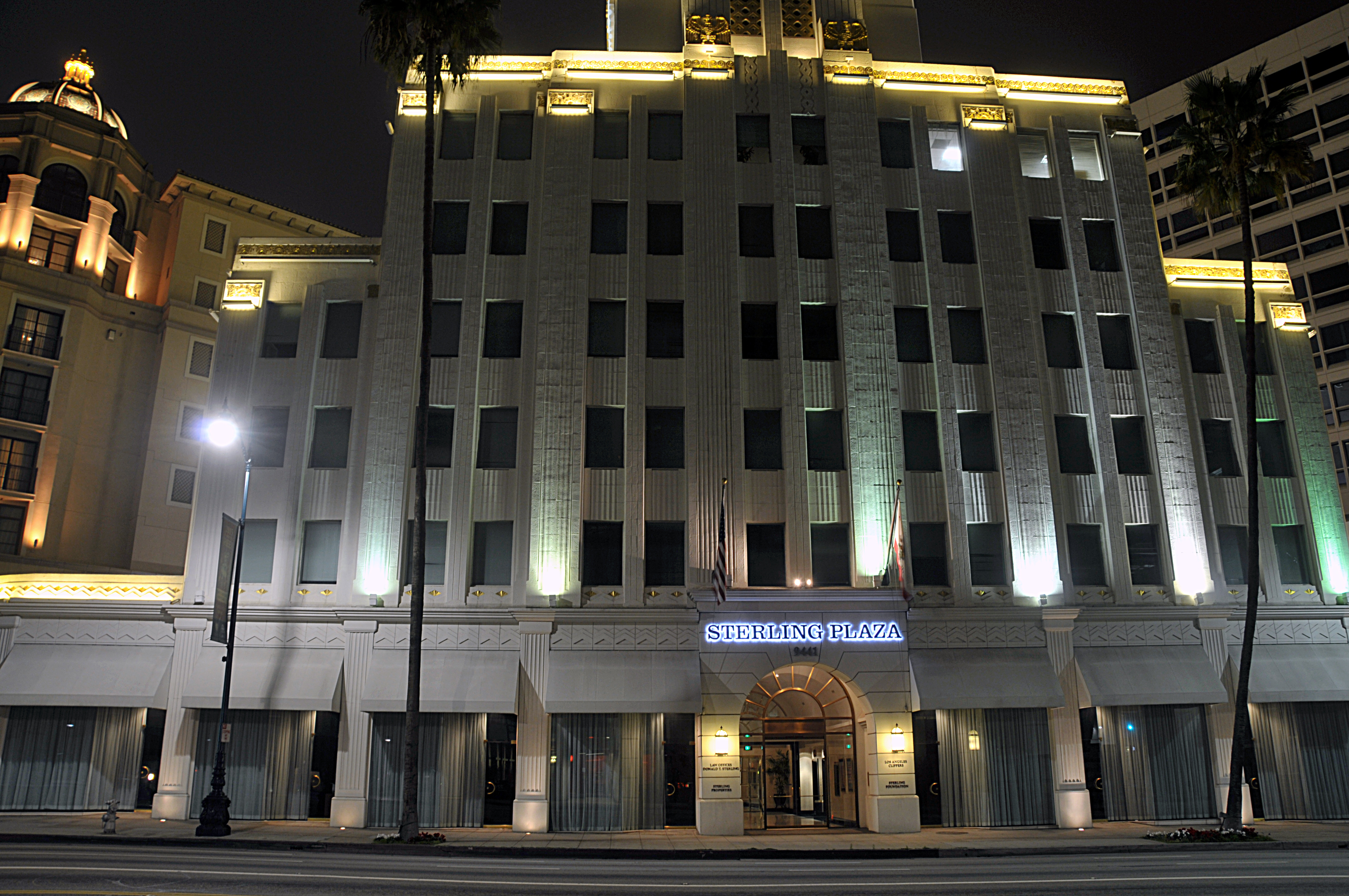
- The Sterling Plaza in 2015

General information
- Architectural style: Art Deco architecture
- Location: 9429-9441 Wilshire Boulevard, Beverly Hills, California, 90210
- Coordinates: 34.06729°N 118.39875°W
- Completed: 1929
- Client: California National Bank of Beverly Hills
- Owner: Donald Sterling

Design and construction
- Architect: John and Donald Parkinson

The Sterling Plaza (also known as the California Bank Building) is a historic building in Beverly Hills, California.

== Location ==
The building is located at 9429–9441 on Wilshire Boulevard, in the City of Beverly Hills, California.

== History ==
Construction was completed in 1929. It was designed by the architectural team John and Donald Parkinson in the Art Deco style. With seven stories, it is 32 metres (105 ft) high.

It was built for the California National Bank of Beverly Hills. As a result, it was first known as the California Bank Building. The building was completed just before the Wall Street crash. It was later acquired by Louis B. Mayer, the head of MGM.

In the 1990s, the building was acquired by Donald Sterling and renamed the Sterling Plaza. In 1976, he leased the California Bank Building on Wilshire Boulevard in Beverly Hills, and renamed it Sterling Plaza. In 2000, Sports Illustrated senior writer Franz Lidz revealed that Sterling had a 99-year lease with the Mayer estate that required him to pay a relatively small annual fee and 15% of any rental income, which was why Sterling had remained the sole tenant. "With no other tenant," Lidz reported, "the Mayer estate faces another 75 years with virtually no income from its Sterling Plaza property. By sitting and waiting, Sterling may force a fire sale."
