= Bobby Samini =

American trial attorney (born 1970)

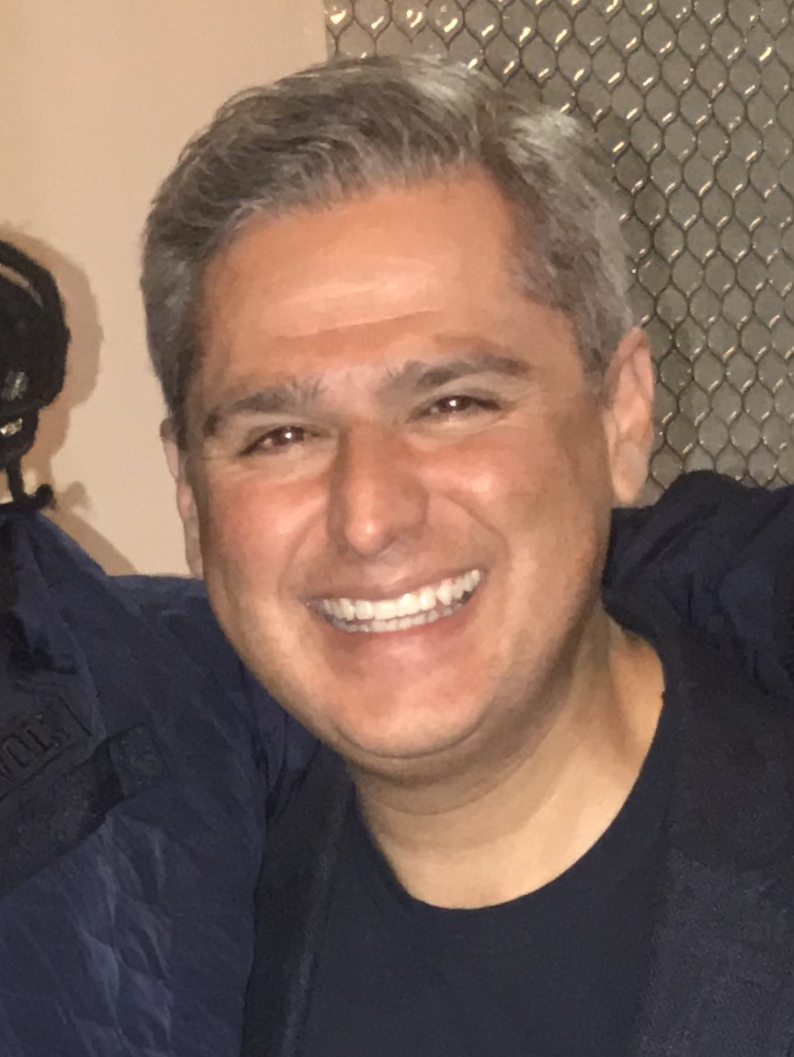
- Samini in 2017
- Born: October 12, 1970 (age 56)
- Education: University of Southern California; Ohio State University Moritz College of Law (JD)
- Occupation: Trial attorney
- Website: Bobby Samini on X

Babak "Bobby" Samini (born October 12, 1970) is an Iranian-American trial attorney and the managing partner of the Samini Firm. He has represented many high-profile clients, including serving as lead counsel to former Los Angeles Clippers owner Donald Sterling in the highly publicized litigation with the National Basketball Association, TMZ, and V. Stiviano. Samini has also represented Grammy Award winning rapper T-Pain and DJ Paul of the Oscar winning hip hop group, Three 6 Mafia.

== Background ==
Samini graduated with a degree in political science at the University of Southern California in 1992 and received his J.D. degree from The Ohio State University Moritz College of Law in 1995. Samini has been admitted to practice law in the State of California since 1996.

== Notable clients ==
=== Donald Sterling ===
Samini received national media coverage after serving as lead counsel to former owner of the Los Angeles Clippers, Donald Sterling, in litigation with the NBA, TMZ, and Sterling's ex-girlfriend V. Stiviano. In April 2014, website TMZ released an audio recording of a man reported to be Sterling making racial remarks to V. Stiviano, following an Instagram post featuring Stiviano and basketball Hall of Famer Magic Johnson. In the recording, the man believed to be Sterling, is heard saying: "It bothers me a lot that you want to broadcast that you're associating with black people. Do you have to?" and "You can sleep with [black people]. You can bring them in, you can do whatever you want. The little I ask you is not to promote it on that ... and not to bring them to my games."

If you're going to come after Sterling, maybe it's time for the NBA to take a close reflection on their own conduct.

— Bobby Samini, The Today Show, June 10, 2014

Following a public outcry, NBA Commissioner Adam Silver announced that Sterling would receive a lifetime ban from the NBA, fined $2.5 million by the league, and forced to sell the team. On August 14, 2014, after an unsuccessful appeal attempt by Sterling, the sale of the Los Angeles Clippers to former Microsoft chief executive officer Steve Ballmer for $2 billion was finalized. In response to the NBA's decision, Samini called the NBA a "band of hypocrites", citing previous discriminatory conduct by the NBA, and suggested the organization "take a close reflection on their own conduct."

In addition, Samini also served as co-counsel to Sterling in his probate and divorce proceedings with wife Shelly Sterling. In March 2016, Samini informed the Los Angeles Times that "notwithstanding all the difficult events of the last two years, the Sterlings have resolved their differences" and decided not to proceed with their divorce.

On November 6, 2015, a Los Angeles judge granted TMZ's request to be dismissed from the case, ruling that TMZ had a right to release the tape because it concerned an issue of public interest. On March 22, 2016, a federal judge dismissed Sterling's antitrust lawsuit against the NBA. The judge concluded that Sterling could not "show that the NBA parties deprived him of a constitutionally protected interest." In response, Samini released a statement, stating that "it is impossible to believe that, in any other circumstance, a private conversation could be recorded and distributed without an individual's consent or that private medical information could be made public in this manner all without consequence." Despite the setback, Samini announced that Sterling "remains committed to the cause."

=== Representation of royal families and sovereigns ===
In 2019, Samini represented Kuwait Interior Minister Khaled Al-Sabah, a member of Kuwait's royal family, when he was defrauded out of a $163 million investment while purchasing a Beverly Hills mountain. Al-Sabah alleged that the previous owner "duped him into thinking he would get a 50 percent cut from his years-long investment in the property."

On July 16, 2020, the United States Justice Department filed a forfeiture complaint against the 157-acre undeveloped hilltop. The Justice Department accused Al-Sabah of illegally transferring more than $100 million to invest in and buy the assets. "My client denies any wrongdoing whatsoever. Any suggestion that my client was involved in any illegal activity is incorrect. Mr. al-Sabah will continue to pursue his legal claims against Mr. Noval in the civil action", said Samini.

== Noteworthy cases ==
=== Cher lawsuit ===
Samini represented financial management firm SAIL Venture Partners LLC against a breach of contract action by singer and actress Cher in June 2016. According to the complaint, her trust invested $1.3 million for clean technology partnerships and claimed SAIL misrepresented the companies' performance to accrue additional fees. Cher claimed that SAIL made "risky and unsound" financial investments through "malicious and fraudulent" business decisions. The allegations included breach of contract, breach of fiduciary duty, and professional negligence claims. The lawsuit was dismissed January 2018.

=== Zillow class action ===
Zillow is a "modern day Animal House."

— Bobby Samini, Bloomberg Television, December 4, 2014.

Samini represented several class action plaintiffs against online real estate database Zillow, alleging violations of California Labor Code and California Business and Professions Code. Among numerous allegations, Zillow was accused of failing to pay wages, failing to pay overtime pay, and failing to provide meal and rest breaks. On February 26, 2016, the U.S. District Court for the Central District of California certified the class to include anyone who worked as an inside sales consultant at Zillow between November 2010 and January 2015.

Along with attorney Mark Geragos, Samini also represented a former Zillow employee in a sexual harassment action against the company, alleging "sexual torture". and "the most heinous acts of sexual harassment imaginable." According to the lawsuit, Zillow's Southern California office represents an "adult frat house where sexual harassment and misconduct are normalized, condoned, and promoted by male managers." On May 5, 2016, Zillow settled the action for an undisclosed amount.

=== Mitsubishi class action ===
Samini served as lead counsel for a Mitsubishi dealership owner with four locations in Southern California in a multimillion-dollar litigation against Mitsubishi Motors North America. Among the allegations, the lawsuit alleged that Mitsubishi forced dealerships to stock more cars than could be sold, resulting in millions of dollars in extra finance charges. Samini claimed the increased inventory cost his client $10 million and that the "impermissible increases in new car inventory at Cerritos Mitsubishi continue to this day."

=== Legal Representation in Student Loan Fraud Case ===
In 2025, Bobby Samini defended Angela Kathryn Mirabella, accused of defrauding student loan borrowers of $6 million. Prosecutors alleged her company misled borrowers about loan forgiveness services. Samini argued the business aimed to help borrowers navigate complex loan systems and faced typical start-up challenges, attributing issues to third-party contractors Mirabella later terminated. The case underscored Samini's role in handling high-profile litigation.

== Media appearances ==
=== On-air commentary ===
Samini has appeared on multiple national news television programs to provide legal commentary, including Anderson Cooper 360°, NBC's The Today Show with Matt Lauer, and FOX Business Network's Cavuto: Coast to Coast with Neil Cavuto.

In addition, Samini has appeared as a guest on Good Day L.A., CNN's New Day with Chris Cuomo and Bloomberg Television's Street Smart with Trish Regan.

=== Publications ===
Samini has published articles and contributed legal commentary for multiple news websites including The Huffington Post, Law360, and LawNewz by Dan Abrams. In addition, Samini has been interviewed by ESPN, the Los Angeles Times, Slate, and Forbes.

In April 2018, Samini appeared in Modern Luxury Magazine.

== Charitable organizations ==
Samini currently sits on the board of directors of the UC Berkeley School of Law Civil Justice Research Initiative and the board of directors of the Orange County Gang Reduction & Intervention Partnership.
