= Cyberhomes =

Real estate website

Cyberhomes is a real estate website owned by Fidelity National Financial and Lender Processing Services (LPS). It lists the most current sales of homes in a neighborhood by similar sales.

== History ==
In 1995 Moore Data Management Services created the website Cyberhomes.com. The site was set up with the goal of connecting homebuyers and sellers with real estate professionals.

In 1999 VistaInfo became interested in acquiring Moore's real estate businesses, including Cyberhomes.com. By December 1999, VistaInfo completed the purchase. At the time that move made VistaInfo the largest supplier of MLS information management systems in the country—serving over 100 MLS organizations and 350,000 real estate professionals.

In 2001 Fidelity National Financial and VistaInfo completed a merger forming a new company called Fidelity National Information Solutions (FNIS). Shortly after the merger in 2002, FNIS pulled the plug on Cyberhomes, but the URL was retained by a key executive.

In 2006 an entirely new product was born and took on the name Cyberhomes. It launched with access to Fidelity National Financials property information database and automated valuation tools.

In 2012, CyberHomes was purchased by Listingbook, LLC.

== Company Today ==
Cyberhomes.com is a real estate information site that provides listing and foreclosure data, property evaluations and neighborhood analysis. The site is owned by Fidelity National Real Estate Solutions (FNRES), a division of Fidelity National Financial, Inc. and was introduced to the public in November 2007.

== AOL ==
Cyberhomes is the exclusive provider of property data and valuations to AOL's real estate portal. AOL Real Estate receives over 3 million monthly visitors.

== Vertical Ad Network ==
In May 2008 Cyberhomes and Adify launched the first real estate vertical advertising network, named Real Estate & Living Media Network.

== See also ==
- National Association of Realtors
- CondoDomain
- Redfin
- Zillow
- ZipRealty
- PropertyShark
