= Walk Score =

Private company that provides walkability service

- Website type: Walkability services
- Available in: English
- Headquarters: Seattle, Washington, U.S.
- Owner: Redfin
- Founders: Mike Mathieu; Jesse Kocher; Matt Lerner; Josh Herst
- Website: www.walkscore.com
- Commercial: Yes
- Registration: Optional
- Launched: July 2007; 19 years ago
- Current status: Active

Walk Score, a subsidiary of Redfin, provides walkability analysis and apartment search tools. Its flagship product is a large-scale, public access walkability index that assigns a numerical walkability score to any address in the United States, Canada, and Australia. Walk Score is a type of automated efficiency model focused on location efficiency. A Walk Score, as well as a Bike Score and a Transit Score, may be assigned to a particular address or an entire region, and the company maintains a ranking of the most walkable cities in the United States. Products for computer programmers include Travel Time API. Higher walk scores have been correlated with higher property values and lower mortgage default risk.

The company is headquartered in Seattle, Washington.

== History ==
Walk Score was founded in July 2007 by Mike Mathieu and aided by Matt Lerner, Jesse Kocher, and Josh Herst, formerly of Madrona Venture Group.

In August 2010, the company launched Transit Score to help users understand the proximity of public transport to an address.

In 2011, Walk Score unveiled an apartment search tool that locates available housing based on commute time to a given location. The tool calculates commute times for various modes of transport including walking, cycling, driving, and public transit.

In January 2012, the company raised $2 million from angel investors, including Geoff Entress, Shel Kaphan, former chief technology officer of Amazon.com, and Rudy Gadre, former general counsel of Facebook.

In May 2012, the company launched Bike Score, a quantitative measure of bikeability to/from an address based on the availability of bike lanes, hilliness, road connectivity, nearby amenities, and the percentage of people in that area who bike to work.

In April 2013, the company launched Travel Time API.

In September 2014, the company launched crime maps.

In October 2014, Redfin acquired the company.

== Criticism ==
Walk Score has been criticized for the limits of its accuracy and relevancy in methodology and results. Specifically, Walk Score doesn't calculate whether there are sidewalks, how many lanes of traffic one must cross, how much crime occurs in the area, or what the weather is typically like. It also doesn't differentiate between types of amenities, for example, a supermarket grocery store versus a small food mart selling mostly chips and liquor.

== See also ==
- Bicycle-friendly
- New Urbanism
- Permeability (spatial and transport planning)
