= Showing Suite =

Defunct American real estate software company

Showing Suite, Inc.
- Company type: Subsidiary
- Industry: Real Estate Software
- Founded: 2001
- Founder: Rick Bengson and Alan Shafran
- Defunct: 2017
- Fate: Acquired
- Successor: ShowingTime and then Zillow Group
- Headquarters: San Diego, California, United States
- Area served: North America
- Key people: Rick Bengson (CEO & Founder), Alan Shafran (President)
- Products: Showing Suite; HomeFeedback; Showing Calendar; Listing Sync; Showing Sync
- Owner: Zillow
- Website: www.showingsuite.com

Showing Suite was an American company that produced a web-based software for real estate agents, brokers, and home sellers to automate the showing feedback process and schedule showing appointments. It was acquired by ShowingTime in 2017 and has been owned by Zillow since 2021.

Located in San Diego, California, Showing Suite was incorporated in 2001 under the name HomeFeedback by founders Rick Bengson and Alan Shafran. Showing Suite is active in the United States and Canada.

Showing Suite produced a suite of software for real estate professionals including HomeFeedback, Home Followup, Showing Sync, Showing Calendar, Foreclosure Feedback.

== History ==
Prior to starting Showing Suite, Founder and CEO Rick Bengson was president of RealPro Real Estate Consultants Inc. He earned his bachelor's degree in computer science from Northern Illinois University. Following his undergraduate studies, Rick attended the Thomas Jefferson School of Law.

Co-founder and president Alan Shafran went on to head The Alan Shafran Group, a team of Prudential real estate agents in San Diego. Previously, Shafran worked for the investment company, PaineWebber.

Shafran and Bengson wrote and published their book, Blueprint For 100 Deals, which was released in June 2011.

Showing Suite was acquired by ShowingTime in January 2017 which was subsequently acquired by Zillow Group in 2021.

== Partners ==
Showing Suite and electronic lockbox provider SentriLock integrated systems in November 2010. Showing Suite's other direct partners were Keller Williams Realty, Exit Realty, Assist2Sell, and Realty Executives.
