= Nataly Kogan =

American entrepreneur

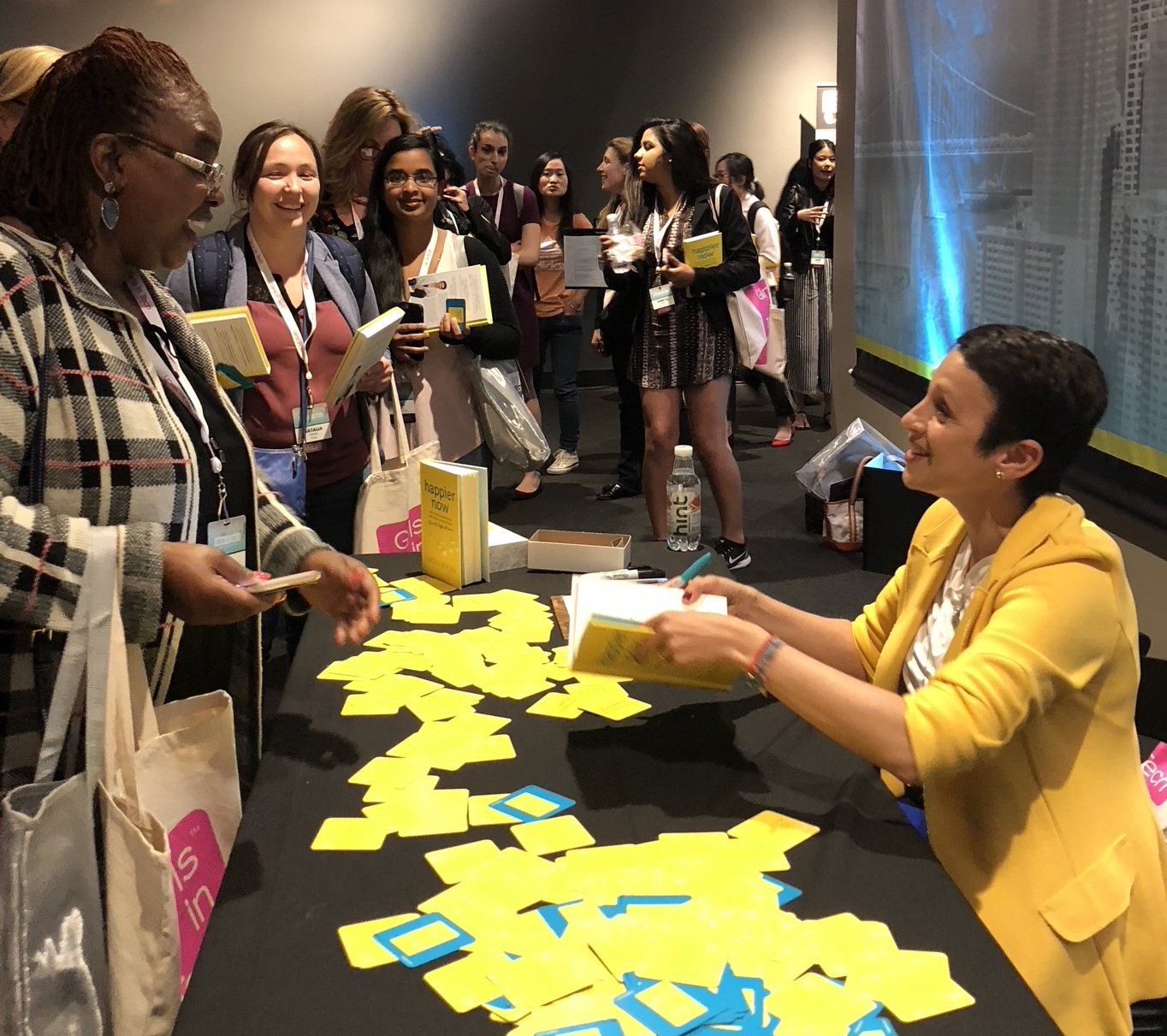
- Nataly Kogan during a book signing in 2018
- Born: St. Petersburg, Russia
- Education: Wesleyan University
- Occupations: Author, entrepreneur, keynote speaker, expert on emotional fitness, and artist
- Writing career
- Notable work: The Awesome Human Project
- Website: natalykogan.com

Nataly Kogan is a Russian-born American author, entrepreneur, keynote speaker, expert on emotional fitness, and artist. She has written three books: Happier Now, Gratitude Daily, and The Awesome Human Project; hosts The Awesome Human Podcast; and is a frequent keynote speaker. In her 2013 presentation for TEDxBoston on How Pancakes Can Make You Happier and Change the World, she talks about the power of gratitude for the small, good moments we experience on a daily basis rather than any huge achievements.

She is the founder of the online community for working moms called Work It, Mom and is the co-founder and CEO of Happier Inc., a wellness brand launched in 2012 that includes books, courses, media, and the Happier @ Work program for teams and organizations.

Kogan speaks and writes about emotional well-being, emotional fitness, leadership, and happiness, as well as creativity and overcoming burnout. She is the creator of the Happier Method™, which helps people improve their emotional fitness by improving five skills: gratitude, acceptance, self-care, intentional kindness, and what she calls the Bigger Why.

She has been featured in The New York Times, The Washington Post, The Wall Street Journal, Forbes, Entrepreneur, Inc., Fast Company, and other national news outlets, and has appeared on CNBC, The Bloomberg Businessweek Podcast, The Kelly Clarkson Show, and on WGBH Boston Public Radio.

== Early life and education ==
Kogan was born in St. Petersburg, Russia. When she was 13, her family immigrated to the United States as refugees and settled in Ypsilanti, Michigan. She graduated from Wesleyan University in Middletown, Connecticut, with a B.A. degree from its College of Social Studies.

== Career ==
After graduating from college, Kogan joined the consulting firm McKinsey & Company as a Business Analyst. She went on to launch her first startup, a publishing company called Natavi Guides, Inc. In 2002, she joined the New York–based venture capital firm Hudson Ventures as managing director. She has also held senior- and executive-level positions at Microsoft and Where (a company that was acquired by PayPal in 2011).

In 2012, Nataly Kogan founded Happier Inc., a company described by Inc. as a "learning platform helping people to optimize their emotional health." Happier publishes courses, video and written content, and other media based on scientific research about well-being. The company provides tools for "finding more joy in everyday moments and being more resilient in the face of difficulty."

Happier @ Work was launched in 2017 as a platform for educating employees, teams, and leaders about emotional fitness, well-being, and avoiding burnout at work.

== Books ==
- Happier Now: How to Stop Chasing Perfection and Embrace Everyday Moments (Even the Difficult Ones) ISBN 9781683641100
- Gratitude Daily: 21 Days to More Joy and Less Stress ISBN 9781683643159
- The Awesome Human Project: Break Free from Daily Burnout, Struggle Less, and Thrive More in Work and Life ISBN 9781683647850
