= Location efficient mortgage =

A location efficient mortgage (LEM) is a mortgage available to people who buy a home in locations where public transportation is readily available. Location efficient mortgages allow people to buy more expensive homes than they normally would be able by factoring in the money they'll save on transportation costs. As of April 2006, LEMs were available in Seattle, Washington, Chicago, Illinois, Los Angeles, California and San Francisco, California.

The concept was developed by the Center for Neighborhood Technology and the Natural Resources Defense Council and is backed by Fannie Mae.

== How it works ==
With traditional mortgages, there is a limit on how much money is available based on the purchaser's income. The cost of housing must not exceed 35% of the household's income (Housing to Income Ratio), and the household's total debt cost must not exceed 45% of the household's income (Total Debt to Income Ratio). This is to ensure that after the mortgage is granted, the household will have the ability to pay for all other obligations.

In high density, transit-rich environments, the cost associated with transportation is greatly reduced. This reduction is, for example, $350–$650 per month in Chicago, Illinois. When this extra savings is factored in, the Housing to Income Ratio can be as high as 39%, and the Total Debt to Income Ratio may be as high as 50% to qualify for a loan. In effect, it allows urban dwellers who depend less on automobile use to purchase a more expensive home.

Program advocates warn potential LEM participants that, while there is no limitation on the use or ownership of automobiles, this program does not lower monthly payments to the mortgage company, and that the increased purchasing power is granted based on the presumption that the household is actually taking advantage of reduced car use.

These loans are resalable on the secondary market through the Federal National Mortgage Association (FNMA).
