= Louis Lesser =

American businessman

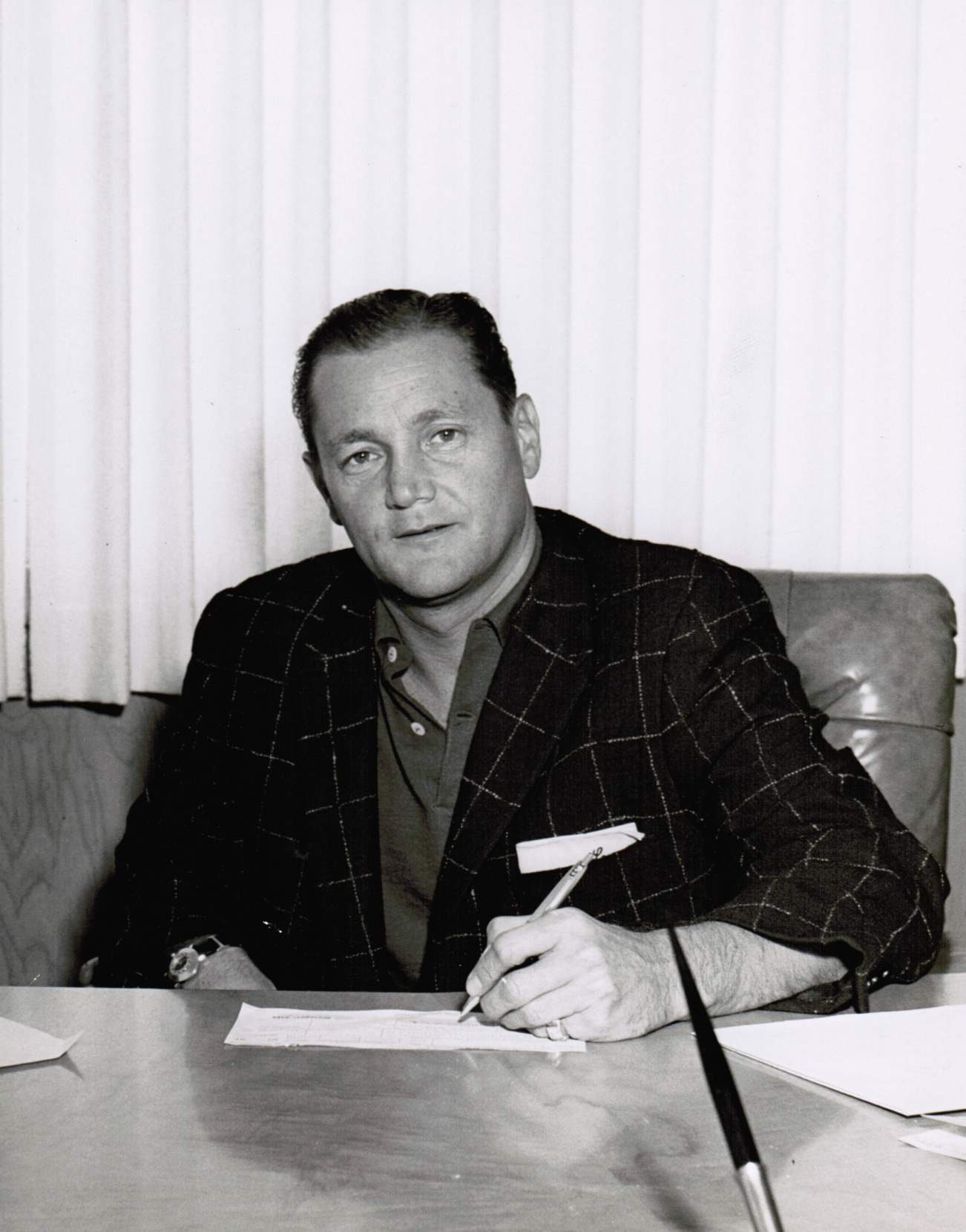
- Born: June 15, 1916; Los Angeles, California, U.S.
- Died: January 29, 2013 (aged 96)
- Occupation: Real estate developer
- Spouse: Jeanne Lesser
- Children: 4

Louis Lesser (June 15, 1916 – January 29, 2013) was an American real estate developer who operated across the United States, predominantly around the Los Angeles area. He also purchased and managed property. Lesser developed Barrington Plaza, a 712 apartment and commercial FHA Urban Renewal project in West Los Angeles.

== Early life ==
Lesser was born and raised in Los Angeles, California, to a Jewish family. He attended Hollywood High School and was very successful at making extra money selling magazines. On graduation, he turned down a supervisory job offer from the magazine company to join his father's small women's clothing manufacturing business.

== Business career ==
=== Early career ===
He expanded his father's clothing business by selling to major retailers. He left the business in 1945, when he was drafted into the army. In 1947, after his military discharge, he purchased Dr. Forbes Farms, a fruit producer. A couple of years later he sold it and purchased a group of gas stations, which later merged with the Sunset Oil Company, where he served briefly as vice-president until his retirement aged 36. An irrepressible optimist, he was attracted to real estate development. He joined Don Metz in the development of Torrance Gardens, a single family residential real estate development in Torrance, California consisting of 437 houses.

=== Louis Lesser Enterprises. Ltd. ===
His retirement in 1952 lasted less than a year. Later in 1952, he and other family members formed Louis Lesser Enterprises, Ltd., a partnership, which bought and developed commercial, residential, and industrial real estate. It was incorporated in 1960/61, in preparation for a $5 million initial public offering in 1962/63. By that time, Lesser estimated that he had developed $500 million of real estate across nine states and that Louis Lesser Enterprises, Ltd had grown its assets from $200,000 to $60 million.

Lesser also developed housing for military personnel, involving over 3,000 units at 14 military installations across the US, with a total construction value of $35 million, with funding under the Capehart Act. He developed an industrial center near the new Los Angeles International Airport in 1956-1957, leasing buildings worth $9 million. He began the development of another $3 million extension to a site in San Diego in 1959, also to be leased to the company. He purchased the Beckman Instrument facility in Newport Beach for $2.5 million in 1958, and leased it to the Hughes Aircraft Company.

In 1959, Louis Lesser Enterprises, Ltd and Ben Deane became partners in the development of Barrington Plaza in West Los Angeles. In June 1961, Deane sold his 50% interest to the partnership, which became the sole order owner. It was completed in 1962, and comprised 712 apartments in one 27 and two 17 story buildings, making it both the largest, and the tallest, FHA Urban Renewal Project west of the Mississippi. The original application for a $14 million Federal Housing Administration loan was one of the largest FHA insurance commitments ever filed.

Along with San Diego developer Irvin Kahn, in 1960 he developed two motels on the Shelter Island reclamation project costing $5.7 million. He participated in the 1961 Casa Conejo development, in the Conejo Valley, and was the largest developer there, building 1,000 homes. In association with Irvin Kahn, and others, Lesser was heavily involved in developing bowling complexes in California, with the Los Angeles Times suggesting that he was the most active developer in this area by 1962.

He initiated a 22-story, 236 unit apartment structure named "Lesser Towers", in 1962, when it was budgeted to cost $7 million. Development setbacks caused by litigation caused the project to stand idle in the early stages of construction for more than three years. In 1965, a new builder was brought in to finish development.

Lesser purchased the Phillips Ranch near Pomona in 1964 for $6 million. At 2,241 acres, it was one of the largest parcels of undeveloped land in Los Angeles County. He intended to build 10,000 homes over five years, with planning to be completed by the end of the year.

Following two years of losses, Lesser resigned as chairman of Louis Lesser Enterprises in 1967 and accepted a bailout from Henry Salvatori, at which point the company was renamed Western Orbis Company.

== Personal life ==
He married Jeanne Mikels in 1937 and they remained married until her death in 2006. They had four children, Terese (Teri), Francine (Frankie), Kathy, and Craig.

Lesser died on January 29, 2013.
