= Revaluate =

- Industry: Real estate, Ratings
- Founded: 1 September 2014
- Founder: Tim Segraves, Chris Drayer and Max Galka
- Headquarters: Golden, Colorado
- Website: revaluate.com

Revaluate is artificial intelligence for the real estate and mortgage industry. Revaluate segments lists and databases for marketers by propensity to move. The award winning third party validated accuracy is the best in the industry at identifying people who are likely to move in the next six months. Marketers use this refined and targeted data to greatly increase their campaigns' efficiency. On Dec. 1, 2020, Revaluate announced the launch of Reside, a growth engine to bring new business; stepping beyond the limitations of their current database, Reside allows marketers to choose new geographic areas for customer growth, blending new customer lists into existing sales processes. This newly segmented database will introduce them to market segments, people, and business opportunities that they may never have connected with otherwise.

== History ==
Revaluate began in 2014 as a startup website that mined data from a wide range of public and private sources and used the information to produce home history reports, each covering a specific residential address. These reports were intended to help consumers make better-informed housing decisions, analogous to the need that online reviews serve for other products and services. In the same month, it closed a convertible debt financing round for an undisclosed amount. In its first two months of operation, it averaged a week-over-week growth rate of 20%. The company updated in 2016.
