= UrbanIndo =

- Available in: Indonesian
- Founded: 2011
- Headquarters: Bandung, {{{location_country}}}
- Area served: Indonesia
- Key people: Arip Tirta (Co-Founder, CEO) and Petra Novandi Barus(CTO)
- Industry: Real estate
- Website: UrbanIndo
- Registration: Required
- Launched: 16 November 2011
- Current status: Active

UrbanIndo is an online real estate destination providing buyers, sellers and renters of properties throughout Indonesia. Founded in November 2011, UrbanIndo provides a range of services to commercial real estate users, agents, owners, investors and developers to find their desired properties, such as keyword searches, map views, photo gallery and agent searches. The website combines property listing with market information and analytic that user need to make informed decision.

== Company history ==
UrbanIndo is founded by Arip Tirta, a former director of investment analysis and strategy of Hercules Technology Growth Capital in Palo Alto, California. When he was making an investment plan in real estate in Indonesia, Arip found it difficult to find the desired property in the internet since the available information was often insufficient. In November 2011, Arip with Petra Novandi Barus and Margareth Jonathan launched UrbanIndo. The website was bootstrap funded for the first year of its operation. Since its inception, UrbanIndo provides features to make it easier to pick informed decision when buying a property.

In May 2012, UrbanIndo announced its Series A funding round led by venture capital East Ventures. June 2013 also saw another funding round led by GREE Ventures and IMJ Fenox Pte. Ltd. The UrbanIndo mobile app is launched in March 2014 for Android and iOS.

In February 2015, UrbanIndo was awarded The Net Promoter Score (NPS) Gold for Property Portal Category by SWA.

In January 2018, Singapore's property search startup 99.co acquired UrbanIndo for an undisclosed amount. At that time, UrbanIndo is the largest property portal in Indonesia, with more than 1.2 million active listings.

== Features ==
The main features are emphasized in the information analytic to facilitate its users to make informed decision, ranging from price movements and regional analytic. The website also provides additional information in its listing, such as nearby and regional sales prices, neighborhood information and access to public facilities.

Search features can be done as a "Smart Search" with a natural language processing input and search by map. The website also provides an assisted finding or posting and make a recommendation to fulfill user needs.

== User ==
UrbanIndo had over 350000 property listings with 85000 daily visitors and 45000 registered users as of August 2015. UrbanIndo aims towards two user segment: user whose age is ranging from 25 to 35 who wants to find home to buy or rent and real estate investors aged 35–50.

The standard service is provided to its users free of charge, where the user can freely upload their properties. There are five premium services offered, namely "search prioritized", "display in homepage", "promoted profile", "cover image" and "agent analytics".
