= Trulia =

Online real estate marketplace

Trulia, LLC
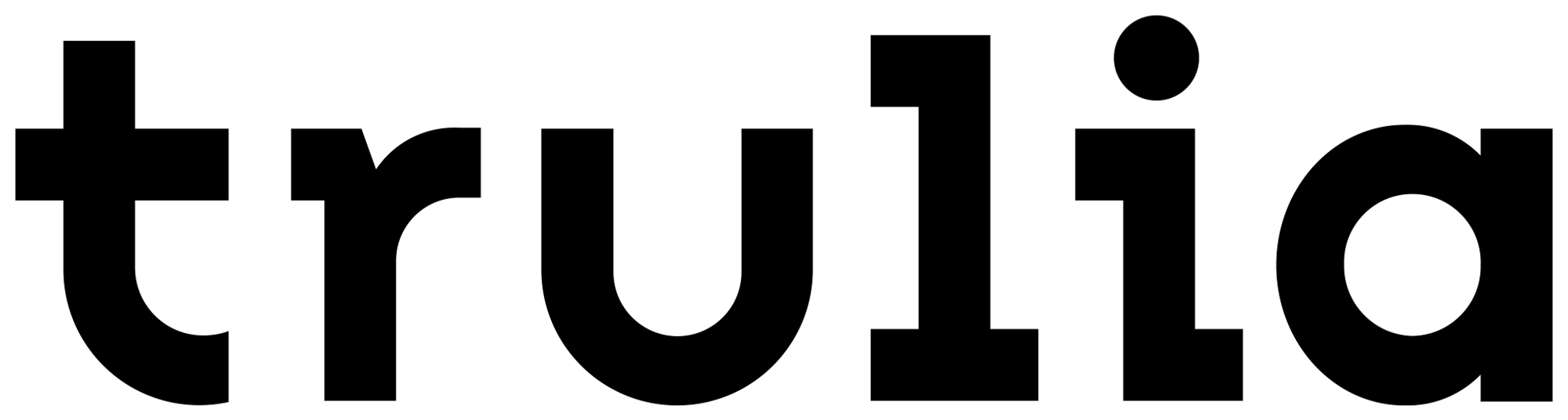
- Founded: 2005; 21 years ago
- Headquarters: San Francisco, California, US
- Area served: United States
- Founders: Pete Flint; Sami Inkinen
- Industry: Real estate
- Employees: 250+
- Parent: Zillow
- Website: www.trulia.com
- Launched: September 23, 2005; 21 years ago
- Current status: Active

Trulia is an American online real estate marketplace which is a subsidiary of Zillow. It facilitates buyers and renters to find homes and neighborhoods across the United States through recommendations, local insights, and map overlays that offer details on commute, schools, churches and nearby businesses.

Founded in 2005, Trulia is based in San Francisco, California, and it is owned and operated by Zillow Group, Inc. Trulia is a registered trademark of Trulia, LLC.

== Company history ==
=== Founding ===
Trulia's founders British Pete Flint and Finnish Sami Inkinen met at Stanford Graduate School of Business. In 2004, while looking for off-campus housing amidst studying for his MBA, Flint discovered that the local real estate information available online was often insufficient, out of date or both. Flint and Inkinen took this opportunity to simplify the process of finding a new home through technology. Flint was the CEO and Chairman from inception to acquisition. Trulia was incorporated on the 1st of June 2005.

=== Growth ===
In September 2005, Trulia launched its beta product, originally only serving properties in California. Soon after, with growing demand from listing agents wanting to give their listings more visibility nationwide, Trulia rolled out across the US less than a year later.

In July 2012, Trulia filed for an initial public offering and stated they would trade on the New York Stock Exchange under the symbol TRLA. In August 2012, Trulia revealed they would plan to raise up to $75 million in the IPO. The IPO was priced at $17 per share, and began trading on September 20, 2012 at an opening price of $22.10.

In May 2013, Trulia announced plans to acquire Market Leader Inc. (based in Kirkland, Washington) for $355 million, expanding its offerings for real estate agents. The acquisition officially closed on August 20, 2013.

=== Acquisition ===
On July 28, 2014, Zillow announced a deal to buy Trulia for $3.5 billion. The deal closed February 17, 2015.

As of February 2019, Trulia's offices are at 535 Mission Street in San Francisco.

== Products ==
Trulia offers a variety of real estate and neighborhood products and services for consumers and realtors.

In addition to its Android and iOS For Sale and Rentals apps, Trulia features:

Trulia Neighborhoods

In August 2018, Trulia launched Trulia Neighborhoods to enable home buyers, sellers, and renters to find information about a particular neighborhood. The feature provides original photography, drone footage, reviews from local residents, and facts about each area.

What Locals Say

In March 2018, Trulia launched What Locals Say, which allows home buyers, sellers, and renters to find information on what local residents think about the neighborhood they live in through polls and reviews.

Local Legal Protections

In February 2018, Trulia launched a service called Local Legal Protections. It provides information on local nondiscrimination laws for housing, employment, and public accommodations alongside property listings based on data collected by research nonprofit Movement Advancement Project.

== Data ==
Trulia provides price trend information by using listing and public data which shows how the price of a home has changed over a period of time as well as comparing that house price with other homes in the same ZIP code, city, county, or state.

Trulia previously featured a crime map with data sourced from CrimeReports.com and SpotCrime.com, which aggregate crime data from law enforcement agencies and news reports. In 2022, citing "bias in real estate", Trulia removed the crime data.

Information on local schools and amenities is provided for each property listed on Trulia. The school map includes GreatSchools data, such as each school's name, grades taught, and the GreatSchools score. School and district boundaries are provided by Maponics. The amenities map is powered by Yelp data.

Interactive Commuter and Transit maps show the driving or commute times from any given point in the United States. Using data from OpenStreetMap and GTFS feeds, a visual representation of commute times is projected onto a geographical map. This provides the ability to see at a glance how far one can travel from any given property in a given amount of time.
