= HotPads =

Real estate website owned by real estate company Zillow

- Website type: Apartments, Real Estate
- Available in: English
- Creators: Matt Corgan, Douglas Pope, and John Fitzpatrick
- Website: http://hotpads.com/
- Commercial: Yes
- Registration: Optional
- Launched: 2005
- Current status: Active

HotPads is a rentals and real estate marketplace launched in 2005 that enables users to search for housing using an interactive map. Listings are displayed at their addresses, allowing users to conduct a location-based search. Through the graphical interface, users click on individual property listings depicted by color-coded building icons.

In 2012, HotPads.com was acquired by Zillow for $16 million.

In August 2014, HotPads launched an updated version of the site.

== Background ==
HotPads was founded in 2005 by Matt Corgan, Douglas Pope, and John Fitzpatrick. The site currently lists 4 million for-sale properties and 500,000 rental properties, with its most densely listed areas being New York City and Washington DC.

In 2006, based on information from 2006, HotPads operated with a staff of 10 people out of Washington, DC. In 2011, HotPads relocated to San Francisco where it currently operates from the Zillow San Francisco office.
