= MyNewPlace =

Apartment website

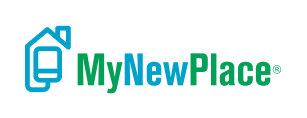
- Company type: Real Estate, Apartment Rentals, Home Rentals
- Website type: Apartment and Home Rental Listings
- Headquarters: San Francisco, California, United States
- Area served: United States of America
- Founder: John Helm
- Industry: Real estate
- Parent: RealPage
- Website: MyNewPlace.com
- Launched: May 2006

MyNewPlace was an apartment listing websites in the United States. MyNewPlace is headquartered in San Francisco in the SoMa neighborhood, but is owned by RealPage based out of Carrollton, Texas.

== History ==
MyNewPlace was founded by John Helm in 2005, and went live in May 2006 with 6 million apartment listings nationwide. The San Francisco-based company operates on a Pay-per-Qualified-Lead pricing model, in which apartment managers pay only when renters contact them through their listings on MyNewPlace.

John Helm had previously started AllApartments/SpringStreet, which became the internet's biggest apartment rental site before its sale to Homestore/Move.com in 1999.

== Investors ==
MyNewPlace was initially backed by SplitRock Partners, Sutter Hill Ventures, and Trinity Ventures, and is also backed by some of a number of real estate investment trusts, including United Dominion Realty Trust (UDR), Essex Property Trust, Marcus & Millichap Venture Partners, ConAm Management Corporation, The Lane Company, and Cowboy Properties.

In August 2011 MyNewPlace was bought by national real estate company RealPage for $74.4 million.
