= Excessivism =

Art movement

Excessivism is an art movement. In 2015 American artist and curator Kaloust Guedel introduced it to the world with an exhibition titled Excessivist Initiative. The review of the exhibition written by art critic and curator Shana Nys Dambrot, titled "Excessivism: Irony, Imbalance and a New Rococo" was published in the Huffington Post. Its early adopters go back to late 20th century.

== Concept ==
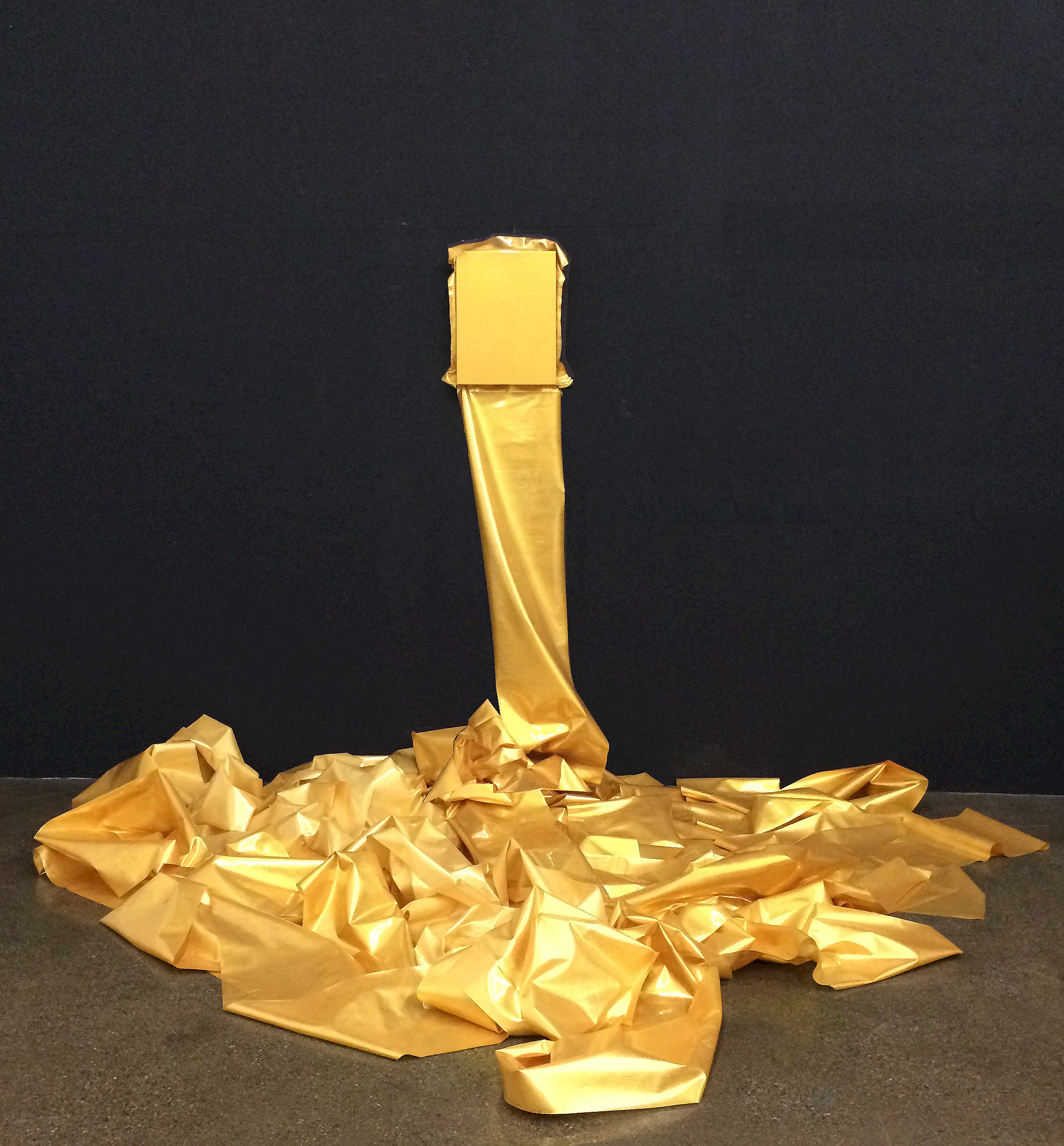
Kaloust Guedel, Art work representing excessivism group, 2014.

Excessivism is a reflection, examination, or investigation of every aspect of life in excessive state with particular consideration of areas that have real and consequential effect on members of society. Subject areas include, but are not limited to, economics, politics and psychology. Its economic criticism is a commentary on economic materialism, and the desire to acquire material goods beyond one's needs.

Excessivism depicts the excessive use of resources in an exaggerated way using two- or three-dimensional visual creations, written or spoken words, or in any other medium. It aims to reflect, examine, or investigate the capitalist system, devoid of aesthetic, legal, commercial, ethical, moral, racial, or religious considerations.

== History ==
The inaugural exhibition of Excessivism took place in LA Artcore Brewery Annex gallery with the title "Excessivist Initiative". And the Excessivism Manifesto was published in Downtown News weekly in September 2015. According to an art critic Shana Nys Dambrot, the idea was conceived in the studio of the founder based on his personal realizations of his relationship as a consumer with the capitalist environment. Excessivism was introduced to the Los Angeles art scene in November 2014 in the Red Pipe gallery in an exhibition titled Excess The New Norm. It was curated by art critic, publisher and curator Mat Gleason.

The inaugural exhibition included works by Brett Baker, Christophe Baudson, Andrew Dadson, Ian Davenport, Jonas Etter, Kaloust Guedel, Don Harger, Zhu Jinshi, Fabian Marcacio, Roxy Paine, Scott Richter, Samvel Saghatelian, Elizabeth Sheppell, Michael Toenges, Michael Villarreal, Danh Vō, Cullen Washington, Jr., Brigid Watson, Leslie Wayne, Ai Weiwei and Zadik Zadikian.

By 2019, Excessivism expanded beyond visual forms to include fashion and music.

== Bibliography ==
- Science Direct, LLaVA-docent: Instruction tuning with multimodal large language model to support art appreciation education December 2024
- Medium, "Excessivism: The Art of More in a World of Plenty, Aug 25, 2024
- Fashion Thinking: Creative Approaches to the Design Process, by Fiona Dieffenbacher, 2021
- Adidas Originas by Ji Won Choi Releases Second Collection, Adidas News, July 17, 2019
- Art As Commodities As Art, Inbal Strauss, June 14, 1019
- A Dude Aikes, "Nothing Lasts... 'Forever Bicycles' Sculpture Departs Austin, Texas", May 23, 2019
- Paraphernalia: Material Agency and Musical Excess", Larry Goves Bath Spa Composers, January 7, 2019
- Excessivism, Ranch Soil: music released September 28, 2019
- Excessivism, Krolik: music released October 10, 2018
- The journey of the most controversial Chinese Artist and Activist – Ai Weiwei, DoerLife, by Rukshana K
- Ethically Chic: Designer Ji Won Choi Gets Deep About Sustainable Fashion, Hong Kong Tatler, by Isabel Wong, May 31, 2018
- Week 2 - AOTW 2 - Ai Weiwei, Art 110, by Salim Qafaiti, October 1, 2017
- Artists on the Cutting Edge, by Addison Fach, December 1, 2017
- Art & Museum, Pg. 48, Autumn 2017
- Ji Won Choi "Shows with Adidas for London Fashion Week Presentation", Snobette, February 17, 2019
- Emerging Designer Ji Won Choi: Between Excessivism and Sustainable Fashion, The Fashionatlas, by Lidia La Rocca, 28 September 2017
- Vogue, "This Parsons x Kering Empowering Imagination Finalist Is Tackling the Excesses of Overconsumption Head On", May 8, 2017, by Nicole Phelps
- 'EXCESSIVISM: A Visual Representation of Over-Consumption, by MORGAN STUART NOVEMBER 26, 2017
- 'Medium, "Artists on the Cutting Edge",
- Diversions LA, February 8, 2017, by Genie Davis
- "La Pietra Dialogues", Ai Weiwei.Libero: A Contemporary Revolutionary, by Nana Apraku, Sep. 26, 2016
- Artcopyblog, Kaloust Guedel's Excessivism and the Rise of Donald Trump", by Brenda Haroutunian, JUNE 26, 2016
- WideWalls Magazine, "Excessivism – A Phenomenon Every Art Collector Should Know", by Angie Kordic, January 2016
- weebly, Week 2 – AOTW 2 – Ai Weiwei, June 10, 2017
- Sustainability vs Excessivism, Fauve Penketh, 2017
- Your Observer, "Chinese Artist Ai Weiwei Used More Than 400,000 Legos to Create His Piece Focused on the Chinese Zodiac", by Brynn Mechem
- Lolo the Donkey and the Avant-Garde That Never Was: Part 1, by Kevin Buist, March 30, 2016
- Asbarez, (Armenian), by Ani Tadevosyan, January 13, 2016
- Gallereo Magazine, "The Newest Art Movement You've Never Heard Of", Nov. 20, 2015
- 'SKETCHLINE, "Excessivism",
- CaliforniaNewswire, New Art Movement, Excessivism, Is a Commentary on Economic Materialism, Nov. 02, 2015
- Downtown News, Excessivism Manifesto, September 28, 2015, page 10
- Kaloust Guedel: Excessivist Initiative, Curate LA, Oct., 2015
- Excessivism: Irony, Imbalance and a New Rococo. The Huffington Post. Retrieved 2015-10-12.
- Picasso And The Chess Player, by Larry Witham, 2013
