= Out of Tune =

Out of Tune may refer to:

- Out of Tune (album), by Mojave 3
- Out of Tune (band)
- "Out of Tune", a song by A from How Ace Are Buildings
- "Out of Tune", a 2022 song by Indian singer Sanjeeta Bhattacharya
- Out of Tune (TV series), 1996, UK

== See also ==
- Musical tuning
