= Clifton's Cafeteria =

Restaurant in Los Angeles, California, US

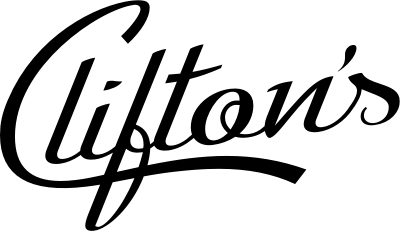

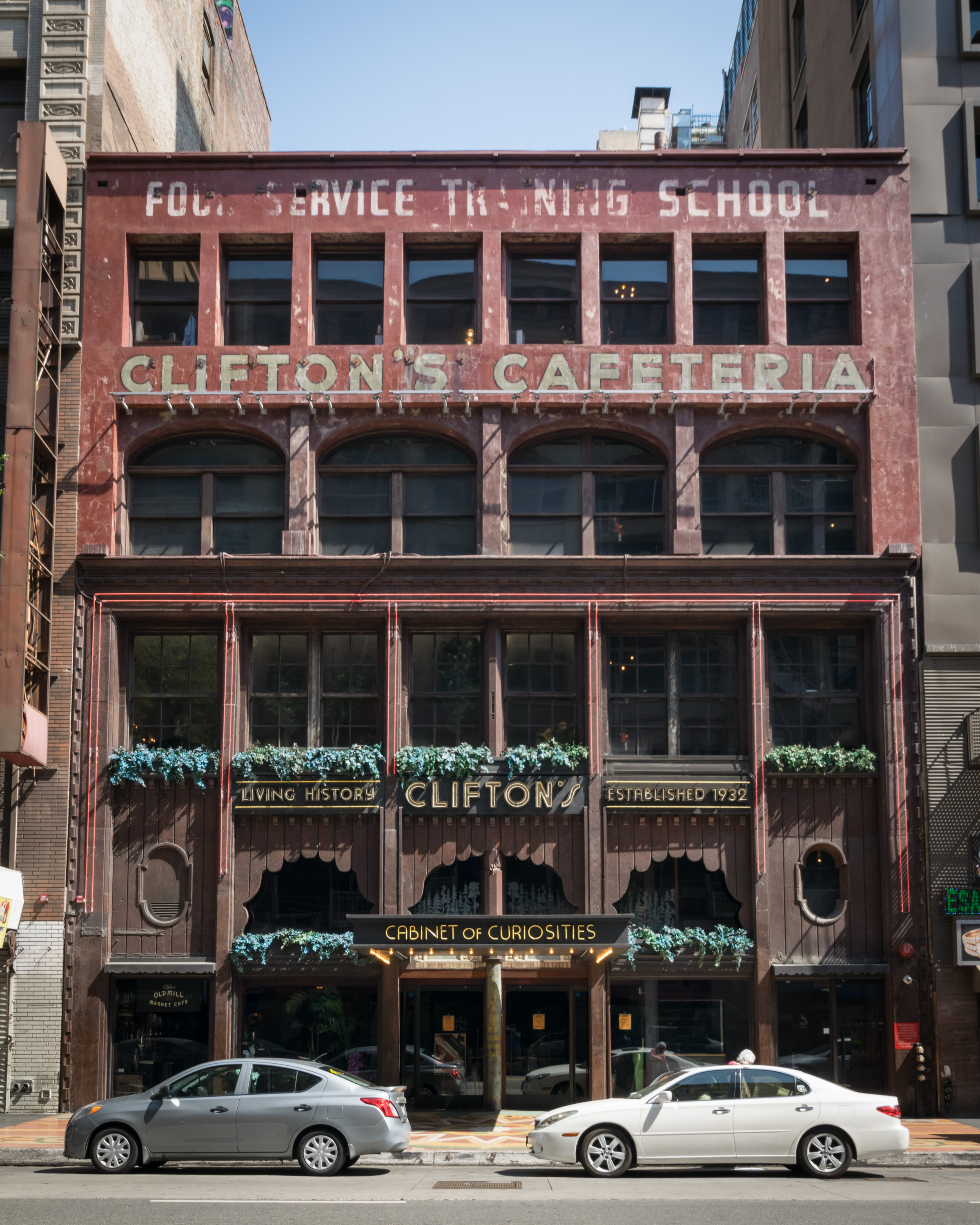
- Clifton's Cafeteria in 2017
- Formerly: Clifton's: The Brookdale aka: Cafeteria of the Golden Rule
- Type: Private
- Industry: Food service
- Founded: 1931; 95 years ago in Los Angeles
- Founder: Clifford E. Clinton; Nelda Clinton (spouse)
- Defunct: November 27, 2018; 7 years ago
- Fate: Replaced by bar
- Successor: Clifton's Republic (bar)
- Headquarters: Los Angeles, California, United States; 34.045319°N 118.252943°W
- Number of locations: 10 (at its height in the 1990s)
- Area served: Los Angeles
- Owner: Andrew Meieran (2010–2018)
- Website: Last snapshot of archived official website

Clifton's Cafeteria, once part of a chain of eight Clifton's restaurants, was the oldest surviving cafeteria-style eatery in Los Angeles and the largest public cafeteria in the world when it closed in 2018. Founded in 1931 by Clifford Clinton, the design of the restaurants included exotic decor and facades that were "kitschy and theatrical", and would eventually include multi-story fake redwood trees, stuffed lions, neon plants, and a petrified wood bar. Some considered Clifton's as a precursor to the first tiki bars. The name was created by combining "Clifford" and "Clinton" to produce "Clifton's".

The second Clifton's facility opened in 1935 at 648 S Broadway. In 1939, its name was changed to 'Clifton's Brookdale', and as the sole survivor of the multiple branches over 79 years, it was known as 'Clifton's Cafeteria' or simply as "Clifton's". It had remained in operation for 74 years. The restaurant chain was noted for each facility having its own theme, and for aiding those who could not afford to pay. This approach to business reflected the owner's Christian ethos—he never turned anyone away hungry and maintained a precedent set by the first restaurant on Olive Street, known as "Clifton's Golden Rule". In 1946, Clifford and his wife, Nelda, sold their cafeteria interests to their three younger Clinton children and retired to devote their attentions to a Meals for Millions, a non-profit charitable organization he founded in the wake of World War II to distribute food to millions of starving and malnourished people throughout the world.

Clifton's Brookdale was sold to nightclub operator Andrew Meieran on September 21, 2010. Meieran intended renovations to preserve its unique atmosphere, as well as the restaurant's 1950-style recipes. In February 2012, Meieran said the remodeling was expected to continue for another 18 months. Clifton's Brookdale reopened October 1, 2015. In November 2018, the cafeteria closed for the last time and was replaced by a high end bar called Clifton's Republic.

== History ==
The Clinton family's five generations as California restaurateurs began when David Harrison Clinton came to Los Angeles from Missouri in 1888 and purchased the Southern Hotel and its dining room in downtown Los Angeles. David's son, Edmond, settled in San Francisco, where he and his wife, Gertrude, became co-owners of a group of cafeteria-style restaurants called Dennets.

Clifford, one of Edmond's five children, learned the restaurant trade while working in his father's restaurants. Along with two partners, he bought his father's interest in Dennets. Due to differences in opinion over business practices, he relinquished ownership to his partners and moved to Los Angeles in 1931.

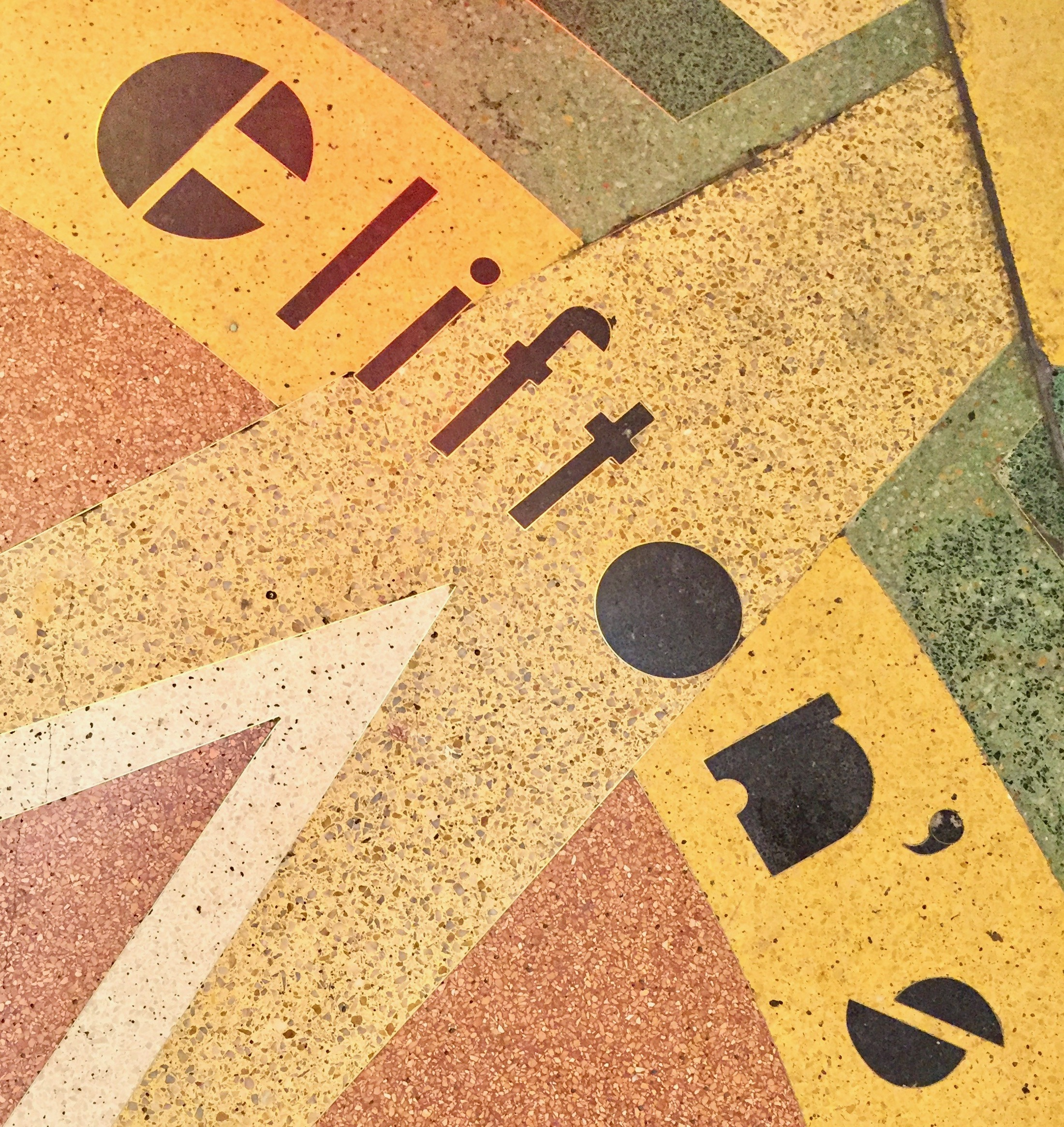
Terrazzo in front of the cafeteria

Establishing his restaurants during the height of the Great Depression, and using knowledge gained from working in his family's cafeteria chain in San Francisco, Clinton made a point to never turn anyone away, even if they had no money, seeking to average only a half-cent profit per customer. During one 90-day period, 10,000 people ate free before he was able to open an emergency "Penny Caveteria" in a basement (hence the modified name) a few blocks away to feed two million patrons during the next two years.

== Fare ==
The restaurants had been cafeteria-style, with each dish sold per item. Featured were fountain soft drinks and classic American fare such as roast beef, brisket, meatloaf, and turkey, with a wide assortment of traditional sides. Revolving daily specials often included a fish plate and a fried chicken plate, both of which came with mashed potatoes and vegetables, and in keeping with the eatery's retro spirit, there was also a selection of Jello salads, soups, vegetables, breads, and classic desserts such as cakes and pies. Additionally, Clifton's offered vegan options. Clifton's desserts were voted "Best Desserts" by Los Angeles Downtown News' readers in 2001.

== Branches ==
=== Pacific Seas ===
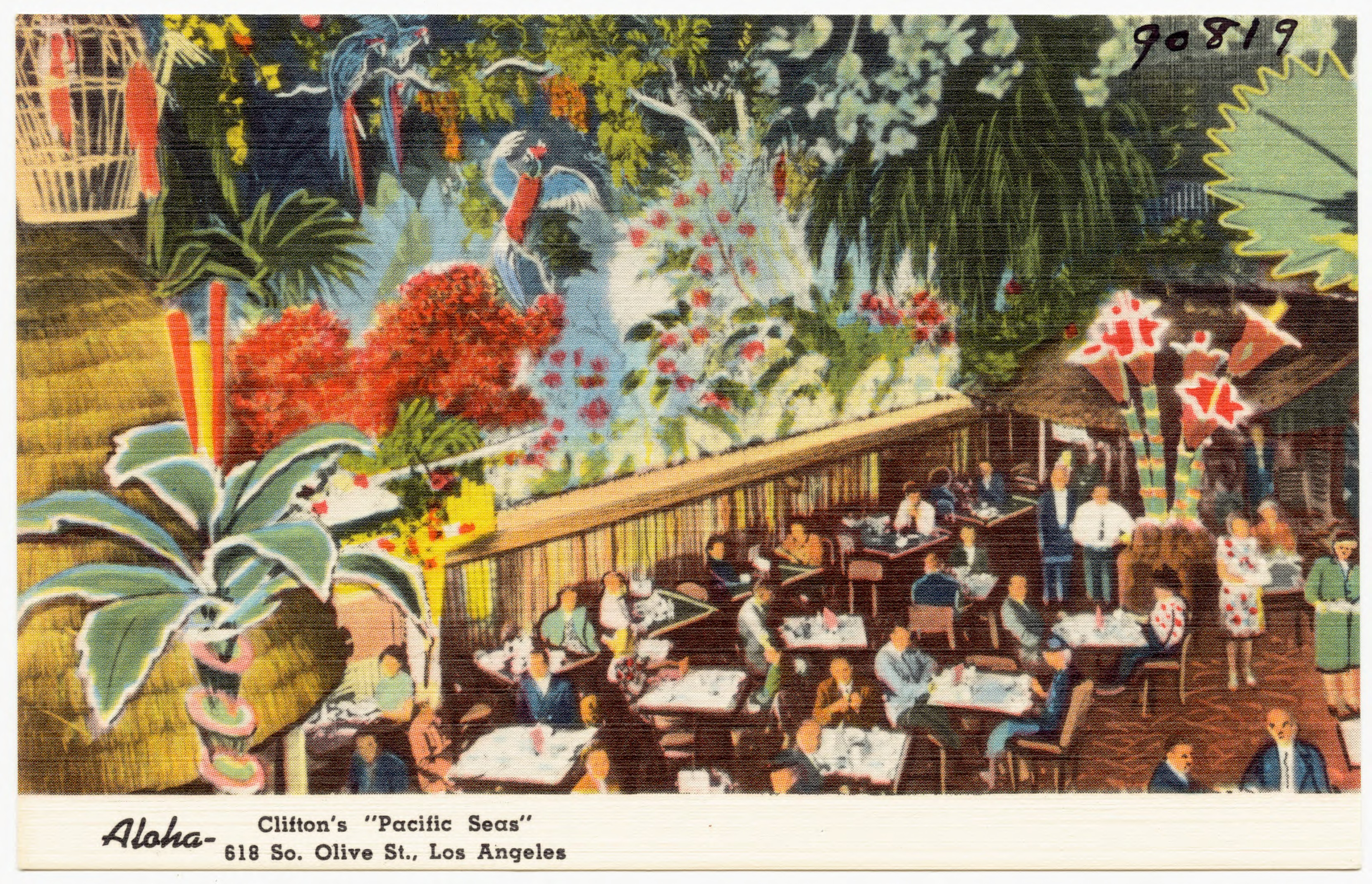
Clifton's Pacific Seas postcard circa 1940s

In 1931, Clinton leased a distressed cafeteria location at 618 South Olive Street in Los Angeles and founded what his customers referred to as "The Cafeteria of the Golden Rule". Patrons were obliged to pay only what they felt was fair, according to a neon sign that flashed "PAY WHAT YOU WISH." The cafeteria, at the western terminus of U.S. Route 66, was notable for serving people of all races, and was included in The Negro Motorist Green Book.

In 1939, the founders of Clifton's remodeled the restaurant, changing it from a conventional dining establishment to a more exotic setting, and renamed it "Clifton's Pacific Seas". The exterior and interior were decorated with 12 waterfalls, volcanic rock, and tropical foliage. Tiki historian Sven Kirsten claims it had a "sherbert-gushing volcano".

Brightly illuminated in the evening, it became a mecca for tourists and Angelenos alike, often being referred to in the same category as other prominent landmarks of downtown Los Angeles, such as Angels Flight, Olvera Street, and Pershing Square. Initially, the Los Angeles Architectural Commission was so unhappy with the facade and decor that it threatened to file suit.

One of the many interior themes of the Pacific Seas included "The Garden", a setting in AD 33. The Garden was first conceived by Clifford E. Clinton in 1943 as an interpretation of the famous artist Heinrich Hofmann's Christ in Gethsemane. Clinton commissioned sculptor Marshall Lakey to fashion a life-sized figure of Christ, kneeling in prayer. The mural behind Christ, depicting the city of Jerusalem and the Garden of Gethsemane was painted by artist Einar C. Petersen.

Clifton's Pacific Seas was visited by Jack Kerouac who wrote in On the Road of visiting "a cafeteria downtown which was decorated to look like a grotto, with metal tits spurting everywhere and great impersonal stone buttockses belonging to deities and soapy Neptune. People ate lugubrious meals around the waterfalls, their faces green with marine sorrow".

In 1960, although the three-story structure with its cascading waterfall facade had become a landmark over the preceding 29 years, the original Clifton's Pacific Seas was closed, the building was razed, and the location was turned into a parking lot.

A much smaller version, in the form of a side-room bar named the Pacific Seas, resides at its still-existing location and pays homage to the original and its history. Some view it as being one of southern California's best Tiki bars.

=== Brookdale ===
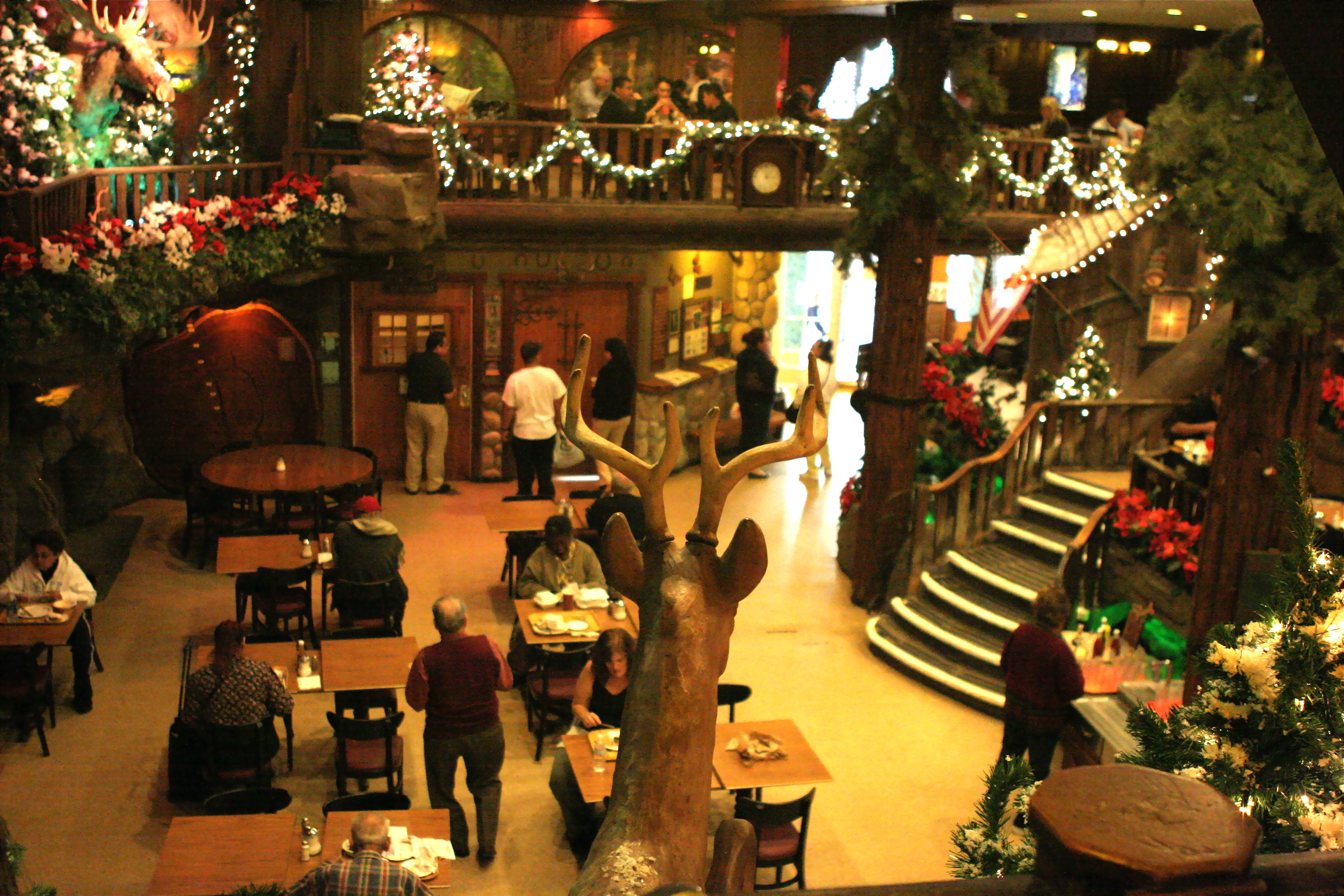
Inside Clifton's Brookdale in 2008.

With a motto of "Dine Free Unless Delighted", Clifton's second Golden Rule was opened in 1935 when Clifford Clinton purchased the lease of the former Boos Bros. Cafeteria at 648 S Broadway in Los Angeles.

Having spent time as a youth in the Santa Cruz Mountains, not far from the Brookdale Lodge, he chose to redecorate the facility in 1939, patterned it after the lodge. Working with rock sculptor Francois Scotti, Clifford created a 20-foot waterfall "cascading into a quiet stream" which then "meandered" through the dining room, past faux redwood trees used to conceal the room's steel columns. Renowned Los Angeles muralist, Einar C. Petersen, created a life size forest on canvas to cover one wall, and a small chapel was set among the crags to fulfill Clifford's desire to feed the soul as well as the body of depression-weary Angelinos. After refurbishment, he renamed the location "Clifton's Brookdale". The interior included a stuffed moose head, animated raccoons, and a fishing bear.

In 1979, when the Broadway Theater and Commercial District was added to the National Register of Historic Places, Clifton's Cafeteria listed as a non-contributing property in the district.

The restaurant was described as one of the last vestiges of Old Broadway in downtown Los Angeles, with an interior that looks like a "slightly down-at-the-heels Disney version of a twilight forest". In June 2006, co-owner Robert Clinton took final steps to purchase the Broadway building they had been leasing for 71 years. With over 600 seats on three floors, and known as "Clifton's Cafeteria", it was noted as the oldest cafeteria in Los Angeles and the largest public cafeteria in the world in 2009. The third floor included a party room, a banquet room, and many pictures of Clifford and Nelda Clinton. There was a secret room on an upper floor. There was also another set of restrooms down the stairs in the basement. The restaurant's busiest period was in the 1940s, with as many as 10,000 customers forming lines down Broadway, but by 2009, Clifton's was regularly serving 1,800 to 2,000 customers daily.

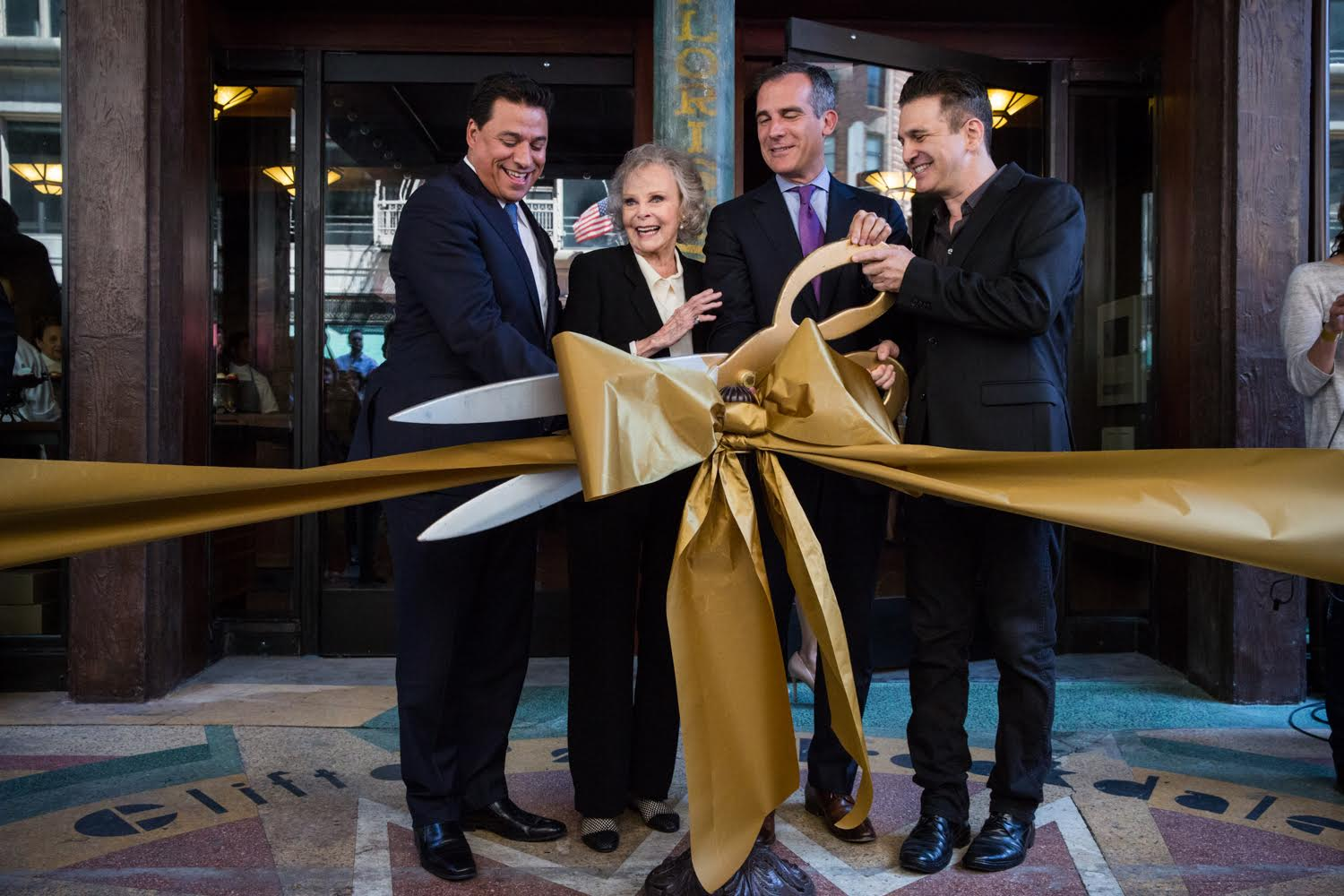
Los Angeles Mayor Eric Garcetti, Councilman Jose Huizar, June Lockhart, and new owner Andrew Meieran at the re-opening of Clifton's Cafeteria in 2015. It was replaced by a Clifton's-themed bar in 2018.

In September 2010, Clifton's Brookdale was sold to nightclub operator Andrew Meieran, who stated he intends to preserve the establishment's food and atmosphere. On September 26, 2011, the cafeteria closed for remodeling, planned then to last three to six months while the restaurant gets a new kitchen and a redesigned serving area. In February 2012, the remodeling process continued with the "unveiling" of the original 1904 building facade, revealed through the removal of the 1963 aluminum facade. Meieran estimated that the cafeteria would reopen in about 18 months. During renovations, a partition wall was removed, revealing a neon light that was still switched on, apparently having been lit continuously for 77 years. It may be the oldest continuously illuminated neon light in the world. The director of the Museum of Neon Art called the discovery "incredible".

The revamped restaurant had multiple eating and drinking establishments inside the building, including a bakery, a version of the original 1935 classic cafeterias on the ground and second floors, an old-school steakhouse on the third floor, and a tiki themed bar on the fourth floor, to be named "South Seas" in honor of the original 1931 facility. The combined-use building will also include a museum called "Clifton’s Cabinet of Curiosities". While restoration of Clifton's at 648 S. Broadway had many delays, the initial goal of Andrew Meieran was to re-open the facility in early 2015. The restaurant reopened on October 1, 2015. The cafeteria closed permanently in November 2018 and was replaced by a bar called Clifton's Republic.

==== Clifton's Republic ====
The bar and nightclub, Clifton's Republic, closed in 2020 as a result of the COVID-19 pandemic restrictions and reopened in February 2022. It closed again in June 2023, due to a plumbing issue. It was set to reopen in early 2024. The nightclub finally reopened in November 2024.

Unlike the cafeteria, the nightclub's reviews appear mixed.

=== Other branches ===
Clifton's third branch opened in 1956 in Lakewood Center in Lakewood, California. The location closed in 2001.

In 1958, Clifton's opened its fourth branch at the Eastland Shopping Center in West Covina, California. In 1978, the branch moved to the West Covina Fashion Plaza, where it renamed itself "The Greenery". This location closed in 2003.

A fifth branch opened in Century City, California in 1966. This location closed in 1986.

In 1971, a Holland themed Clifton's opened at the Whittier Quad shopping center. Named Holland House, this location featured windmill murals and an ambiance reminiscent of old Holland.

In 1974, Clifton's opened a branch in the Inland Center Mall in San Bernardino.

In 1975, Clifton's opened 'Clifton's Silver Spoon' at 515 W. 7th Street in downtown Los Angeles. The Marshall Lakey statue of Christ, which had been placed in storage upon the closure of Pacific Seas in 1960, was displayed at this location. Fight Club shot in this location, and the location closed in 1997, after which the Christ statue was relocated to The Holyland Exhibit.

In 1987, Clifton's opened a branch across from Leisure World in Laguna Hills, California. Senior citizens accounted for 90% of this location clientele; it closed in 1999.

Clifton's opened a branch in Woodland Hills, California that currently operates as an event venue.

== Reception ==
The restaurant has made an impression on many who have visited. LA Weekly: "...Clifton's Cafeteria, that Depression-era palace of retroville." Los Angeles Downtown News: "...Clifton's Cafeteria, the kitschy cool L.A. establishment that has been around since 1931".

In Los Angeles Off the Beaten Path, author Lark Ellen Gould describes Clifton's as "part national park kitsch, part Disney nightmare, part Grandma's house with fake squirrels, taxidermied deer, stuffed moose, and faux waterfalls", and it is described by Los Angeles Times as one of the last vestiges of Old Broadway in downtown Los Angeles, with an interior that looks like a "slightly down-at-the-heels Disney version of a twilight forest".

Huell Howser, host and producer of the KCET series Visiting...with Huell Howser, featured Clifton's in one episode, where in 2001 he shared "Nestled in the bustling setting of historic Broadway, Clifton's Cafeteria is truly a 'jewel in the heart of the Jewelry District'". Howser returned in 2009, only to find little change. Benji Lanyado of The Guardian lists Clifton's as among LA's top 10 cult locations and notes that it "survives as an astonishing woodland fantasia".

Michael Stern of Roadfood wrote that the surviving location of Clifton's was "an amazing place to eat", with a food line that was "immense", noting that choices included fried chicken with buttermilk biscuits, oxtail stew, turkey and dressing, and side dishes ranging from whipped or fried potatoes to 'cranberry jewel gelatin'. He wrote that for those with "fond memories of school lunch", Clifton's offers simple fare such as "grilled cheese sandwiches cooked crisp and pressed flat as a pancake". He remarked that its current location was in a part of Los Angeles that was once fashionable and wrote, "Once you arrive at Clifton's, though, you can feel the magic that used to be".

The restaurant's uniqueness has also found its way into many books and novels, including The Long Embrace, Violin Dreams, Don't spit on my corner, A Few Good Women, Deep Heet!, and Remain Silent, among many others. In the novel Strange Angel, author George Pendel describes Clifton's as "a bizarre experience", and a "kitsch cafeteria provided millions of low-priced meals to the out-of-work and destitute during the darkest days of the depression", and that it provided a "surreal sanctuary from a broken world".

== Notable patrons ==
Science fiction author Ray Bradbury ate at Clifton's as a struggling writer, often taking advantage of the policy that anyone who couldn't afford to pay didn't have to. He also attended meetings of the Los Angeles Science Fiction Society, which met at the restaurant in the 1930s. Author/agent/fan/collector Forrest J Ackerman later wrote, "...we moved to Clifton's Cafeteria, a feature of which was their free limeade and lime juice. Some of the members who didn't have more than a nickel or dime to spend guzzled a lot of that free juice." Bradbury celebrated his 89th birthday at Clifton's in 2009.

== In popular culture ==
Charles Bukowski mentions Clifton's Cafeteria in his novel Ham on Rye: "Clifton's Cafeteria was nice. If you didn't have much money, they let you pay what you could. And if you didn't have any money, you didn't have to pay. [...] It was owned by some very nice rich old man, a very unusual person."

The Distillers mention Clifton's in the song "City of Angels" on the album Sing Sing Death House: "Emptiness never sleeps at Clifton's 6 am, with your bag lady friend and your mind descending."

The restaurant was featured in Visiting...with Huell Howser Episode 832.

Michel Butor's 1962 book Mobile includes text from three Clifton's Cafeteria pamphlets.

== See also ==
- Ransom M. Callicott, partner with Clinton and co-owner of Clifton's
- List of defunct restaurants of the United States
