= Krulik =

Krulik is a surname, a phonetic rendering of Polish surname Królik. Notable people with the surname include:

- Jeff Krulik, director of independent films and a former Discovery Channel producer
- Nancy E. Krulik, American writer
