= Kaloust Guedel =

American painter

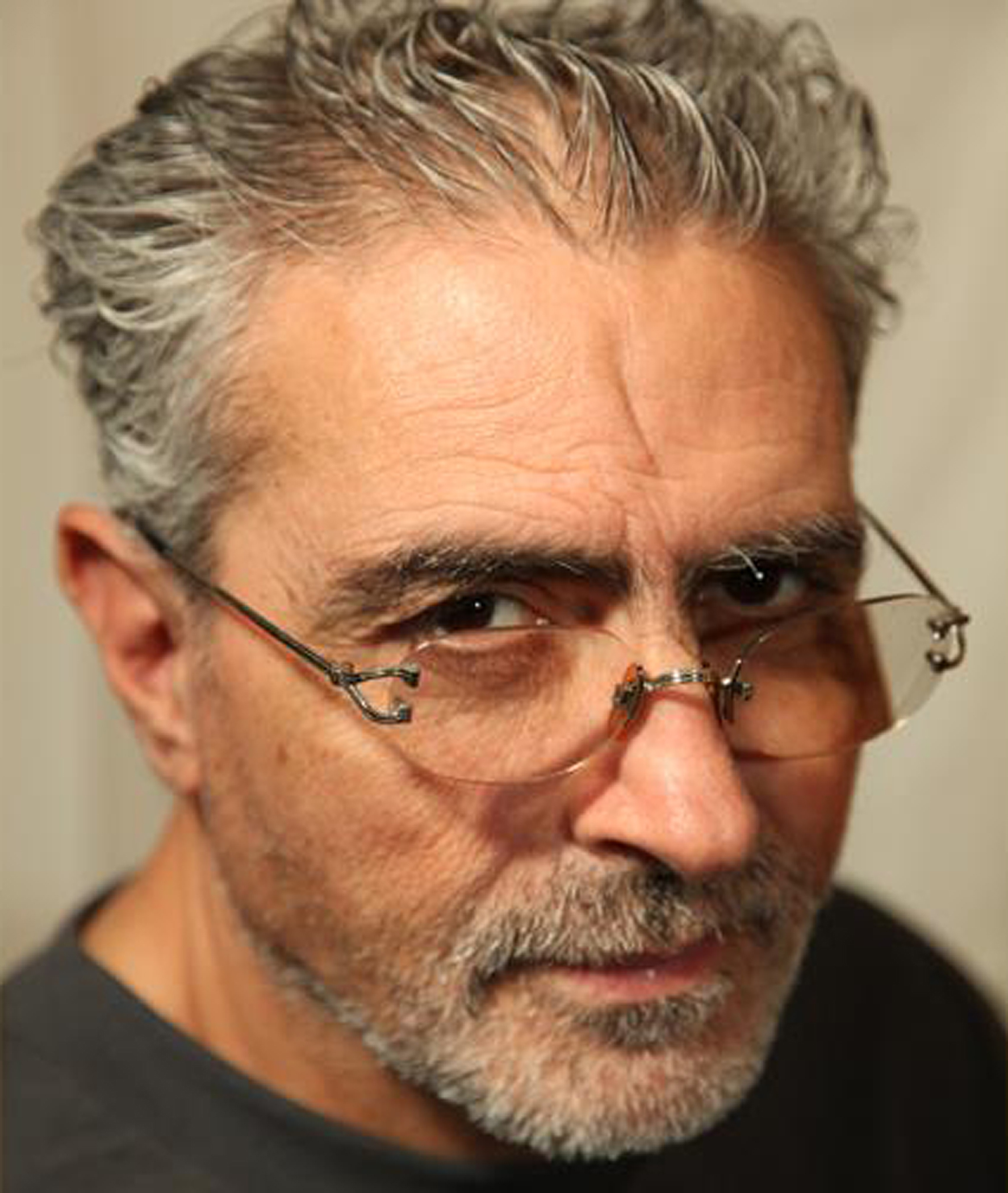
- Born: October 31, 1956 (age 69)
- Known for: Painting and Sculpture
- Movement: Excessivism (founder); Immersive paintings Light and Space

Kaloust Guedel (born October 31, 1956) is a Cyprus-born American artist of Armenian descent. He is a self-educated artist and theorist. Guedel is known as the founder of the Excessivism movement. He lives and works in Los Angeles, California since 1975.

== Works ==
Kaloust Guedel's work explores contemporary issues often taking a critical stand on various societies shortcomings. Throughout the years, it has explored subjects as genocide, war, abuse and others. Regardless of the styles and technics he has employed, his work has been consistent with contemporary sensibility and has reflected the consciousness of its time. Guedel is the first artist who used vinyl as a medium in paintings. He has been featured in publications like Masters of Today and has been known to explore capitalism and excess in his minimalist conceptual artworks.

Kaloust Guedel presented the Excessivism movement in an exhibition "Excessivist Initiative" in LA Artcore Brewery Annex, and the Excessivism Manifesto was published in Downtown News weekly in September 2015. Downtown News, Excessivism Manifesto, September 28, 2015 p. 10.

== Immersive paintings ==
Later he rediscovered inlay technique as a method of investigation of immersion with his new group called Immersive paintings. When he placed one of his three-dimensional works into a painting by carving its shape out of it and inserting it into the hollow space that corresponded with the shape of the object, the result was unexpected. An ancient technique known as inlay was discovered by chance. The use of inlay is a key element of this artistic concepts. The inserted object has more visual weight, while the surrounding space, which is less conceptually important, is seen as the body of the painting. Use of the inlay produces a silhouette of the subject; most often, it is used with a contrasting background, or texture to draw attention to the main subject, which is then seen as the relationship between the two objects.

== Selected exhibitions ==
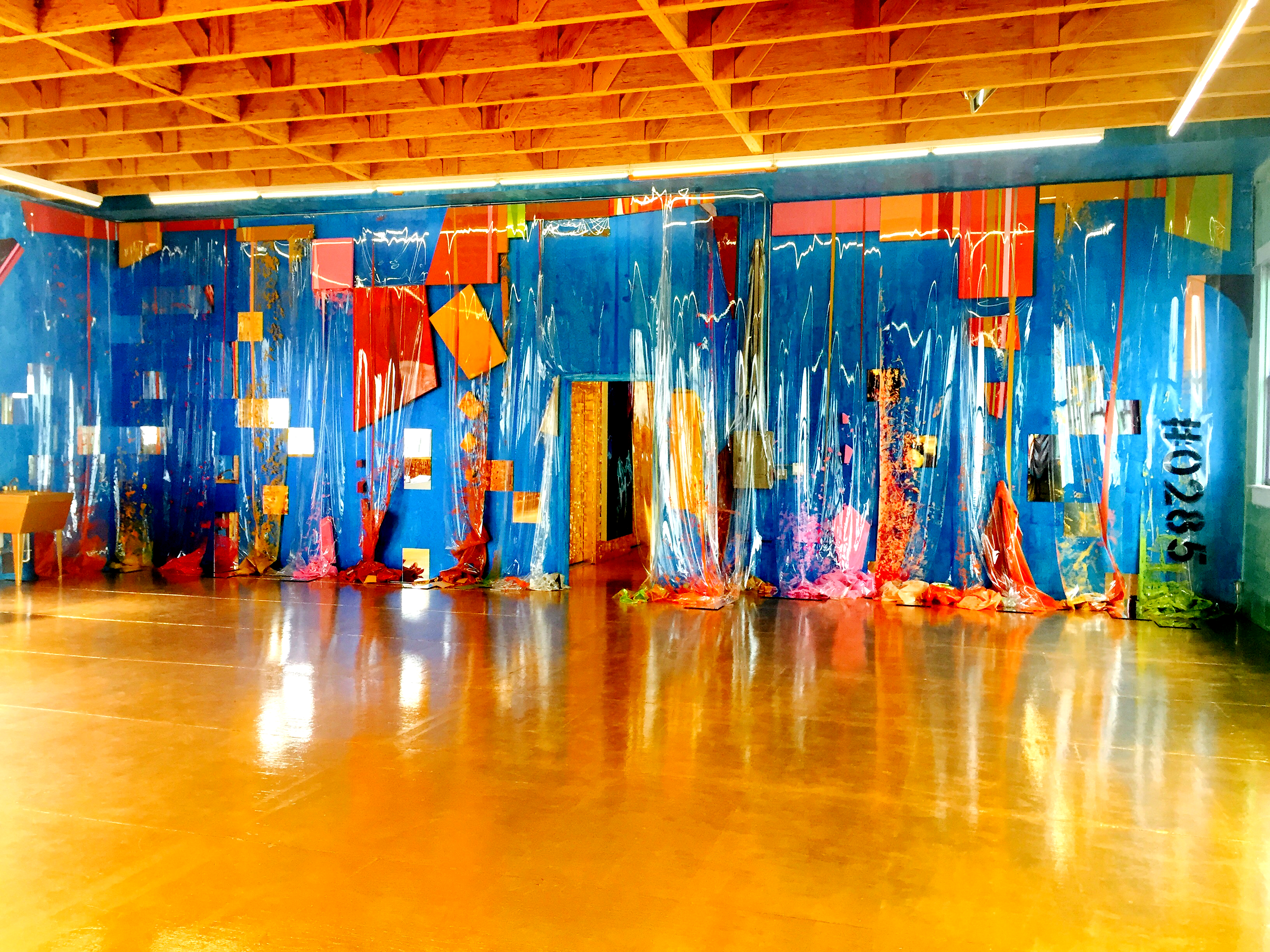
Coronation of Vagina, 45ft x 16ft, 2016-2017

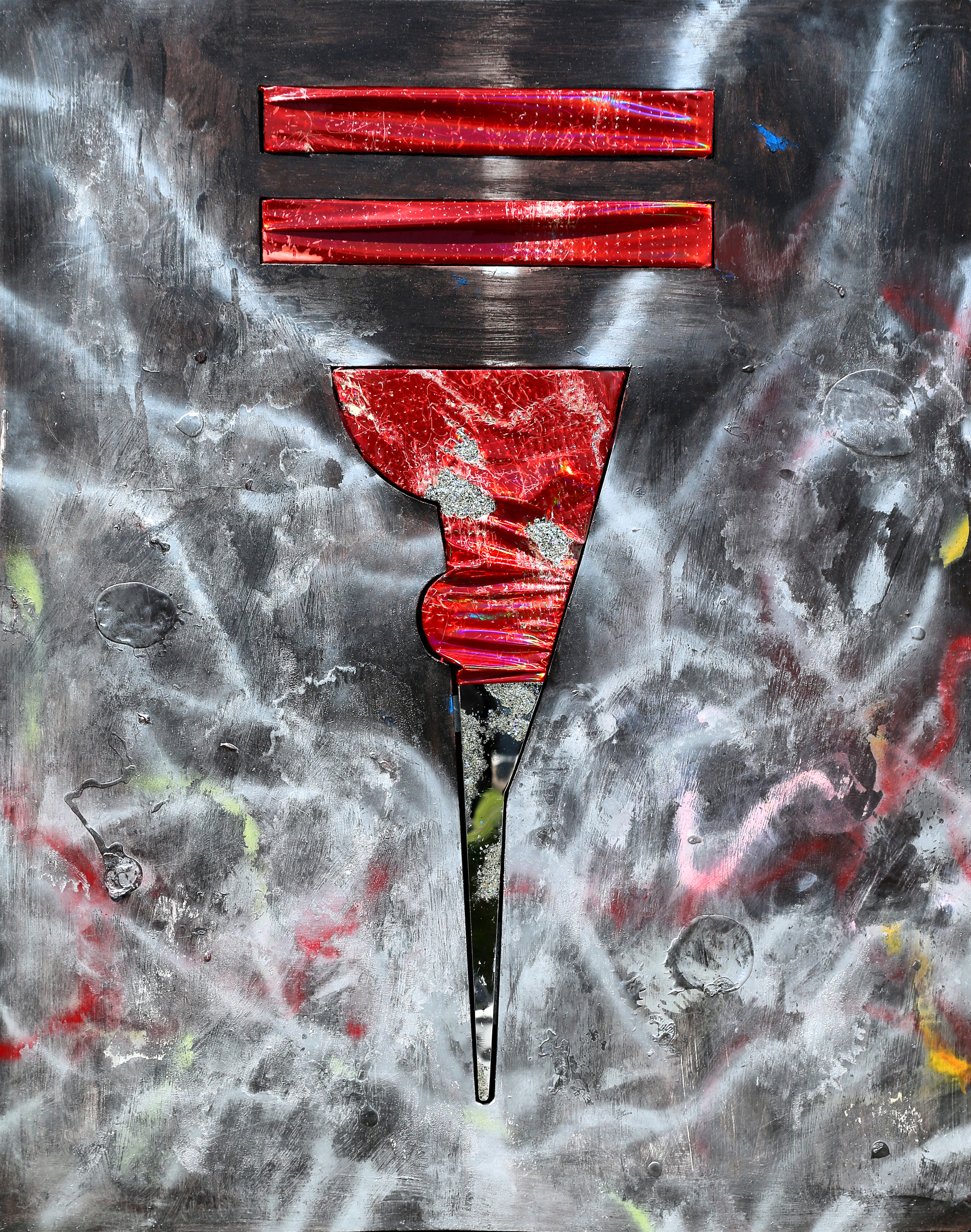
Immersive paintings, 60" x 48", 2022

- Modern Art Museum of Yerevan, Armenia, 2024
- Tokyo Metropolitan Art Museum, Tokyo, Japan, 2023
- Lancaster Museum of Art and History, Lancaster, CA, 2023
- Armenian Library and Museum of America, Watertown, Ma., 2022–23
- The National Art Center, Tokyo, Japan, 2019
- Nagasaki Fine Art Museum, Nagasaki, Japan, 2017
- Saatchi Gallery, London, UK 2013
- Sejong Center, So. Korea, 2008
- Modern Art Museum of Yerevan, Armenia, 2005
- Forest Lawn Memorial Park (Glendale), the Museum, Glendale, CA, 2003
- Butler Institute of American Art, Youngstown, OH, 1986

== Awards and commendations ==
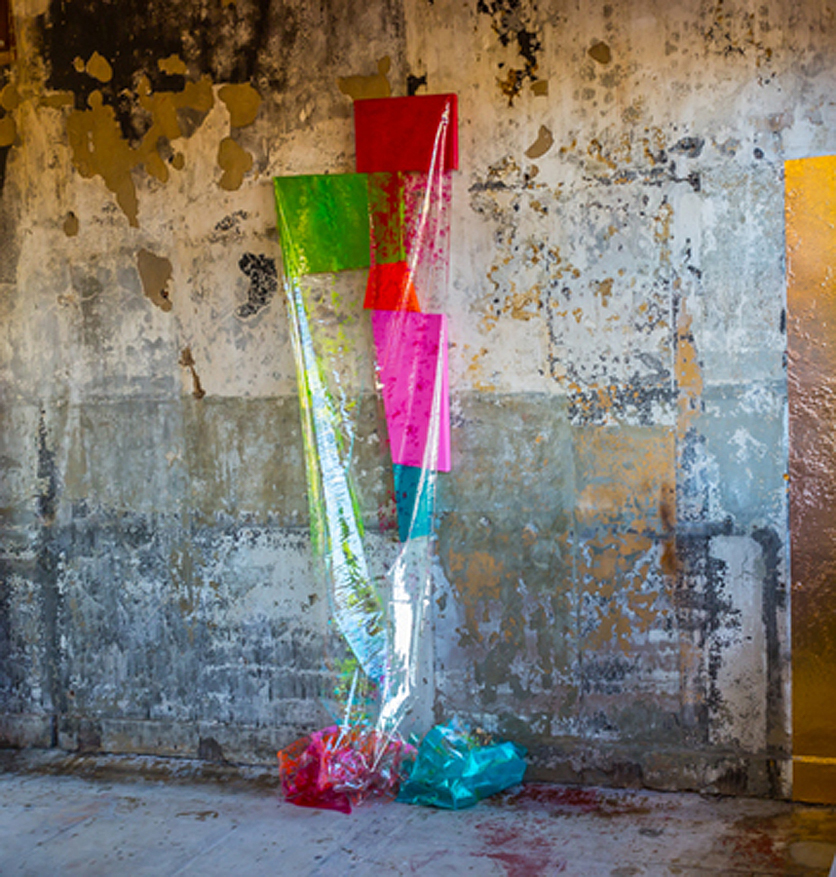
Kaloust Guedel, Visual Gravity #2, 2017

- Laura Friedman, Assemblymember, 43rd Assembly District, April 19, 2019
- Anthony Portantino, Senator, April 19, 2019
- Marquis Who's Who in American Art Lifetime Achievement, 2017
- ArtSlant 1at 2015 Prize Showcase Winner
- Adam B. Schiff, Member of Congress, April 25, 2013
- Ara Najarian, Council Member Chair, June 18, 2009
- Frank Quintero, Mayor of Glendale, April 25, 2003
- New American Paintings, Number 31, by The Open Studios Press, 2000

== Bibliography ==
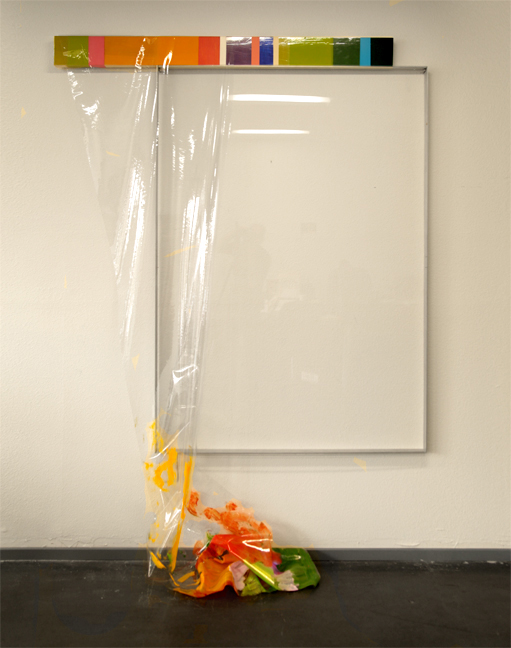
Painting no1

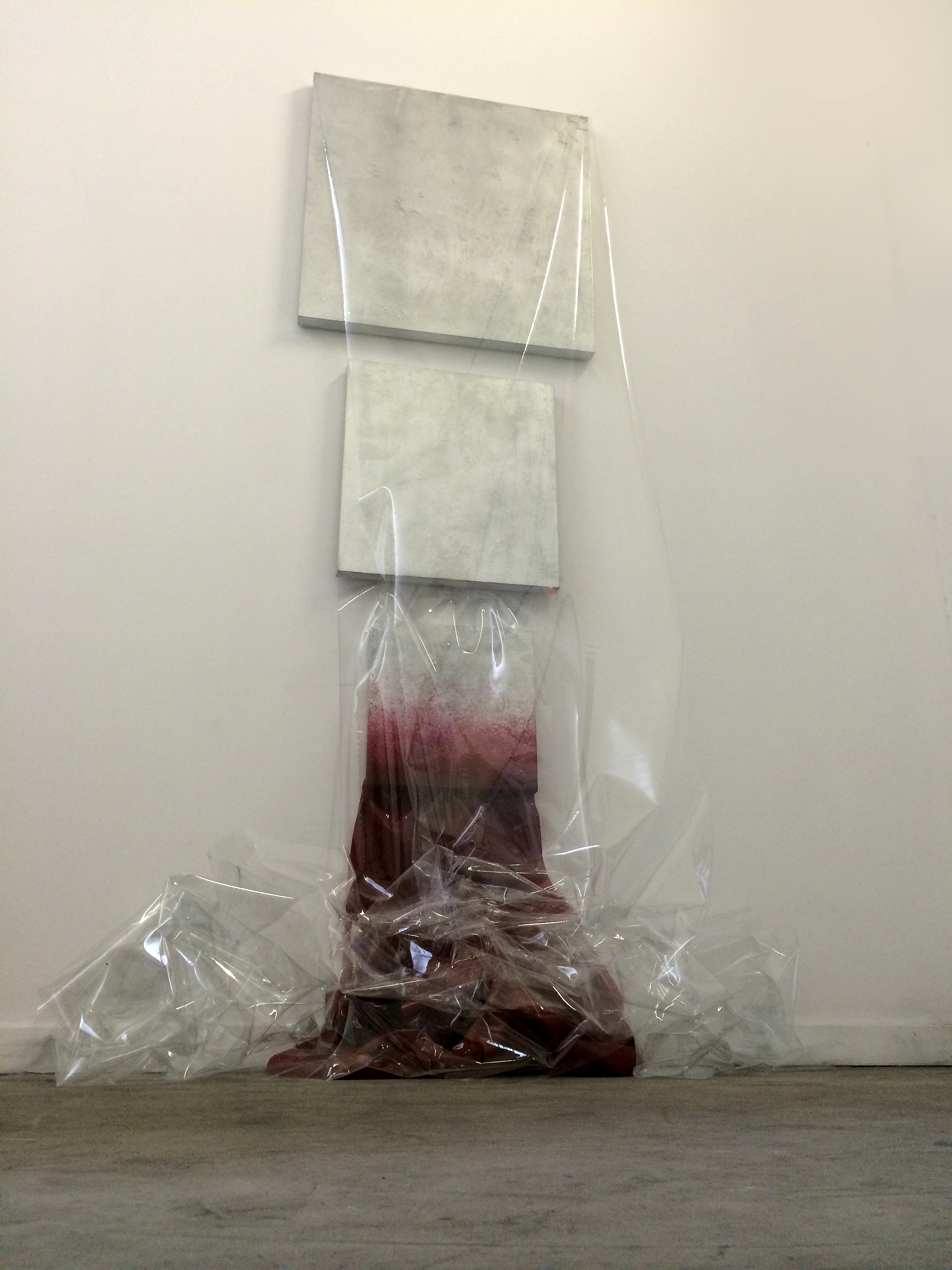
From Silver To Red, 2016

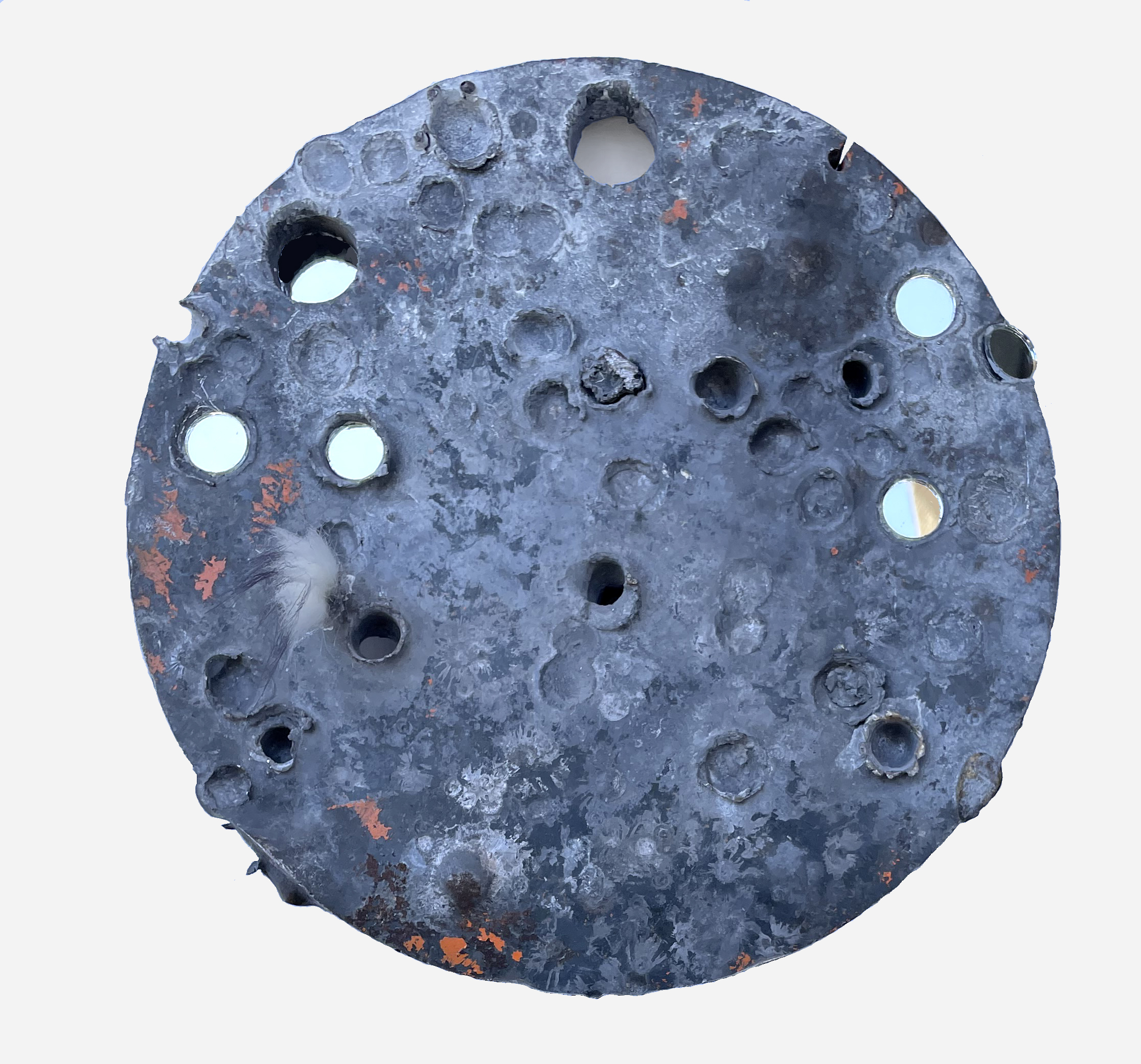
Traces, 2023, created by firing various caliber bullets into the surface of the metal and randomly laying mirrors in the cavities.

- 'Mirror Spectator, Convergence: An Exhibit That Keeps The Conversation Alive,
- 'Colorado Boulevard, Armenian Diaspora Artists Take Center Stage at Forest Lawn’s New Exhibition,
- 'Global Art Critique, Kaloust Guedel – Unauthorized Stage of Tension,
- 'Voyage LA, Check Out Kaloust Guedel’s Story,
- 'Showcase My Art, Kaloust Guedel: Reshaping the Norms of Contemporary Art, by Caroline Margaret
- 'Shoutout LA, Meet Kaloust Guedel - Visual Artist, February 19, 2025
- 'Medium, "Excessivism: The Art of More in a World of Plenty",
- 'Tokyo Metropolitan Art Museum, The 22nd international Art Exchange Exhibition, (exhibition catalog), 2023
- 'India Art'n Design, Old Inlay Technique in Contemporary Art!, Oct. 12, 2022
- Boston Herald, How A Los Angeles Artist Transforms An Ancient Chinese Technique Into Contemporary Painting, September 8, 2022
- 'Fahrenheit Magazine, Kaloust Guedel, with excess in his veins, May 2021
- 'Fahrenheit Magazine, Irony, imbalance and study at the heart of excessivism, May 2021
- Diversions LA, All That Glitters, by Genie Davis January 6, 2017
- Asbarez, Խառնաշփոթից Դէպի Արուեստ՝ Ըստ Գալուստ Գէոդելի, by Ani Tadevosyan, August 10, 2023
- West Hollywood Lifestyle, Expansive Space Inside The Historic 7th Street Market Features New Work
- Fashion Thinking: Creative Approaches to the Design Process, by Fiona Dieffenbacher, 2021
- Irony, imbalance and study at the heart of excessivism, Fahrenheit Magazine, March 13, 2021
- New American Paintings, 2020 Featured Artists / Recent Work, 2020
- Artillery Magazine, The Nothing that is, by Genie Davis, November 20, 2019
- 'Art and Cake, “The Nothing That Is” at Brand Library and Art Center, by Lorraine Heitzman, November 27, 2019
- The Best modern and Contemporary Artists, by Salvator Russo and Francesco Saverio Russo, 2017
- Art & Museum, (p. 48) Autumn 2017
- HotArtStuff, WALLS: A quest for immersive space in DTLA's newest collaborative studio/project, PRODUCE HAUS, By Shana Nys Dambrot, March 22, 2017
- Yokohama Civic Gallery At Azamino, exhibition catalog, 2017
- Artillery Magazine
- 'List of 8 Light And Space Famous Artists Painters
- 'HonaragaArt, by Kiana Boroumand, May 2017
- LA Art Party, Celebrate the Art of Zadikian, Kaloust Guedel, and KuBO! by Kathy Leonardo
- Artcopyblog, KALOUST GUEDEL’S EXCESSIVISM AND THE RISE OF DONALD TRUMP, by Brenda Haroutunian, JUNE 26, 2016
- WideWalls Magazine, Excessivism - A Phenomenon Every Art Collector Should Know, by Angie Kordic, December 1, 2015
- Նոր Ուղղութիւն Արուեստում՝ Պարտադրում Է Ժամանակակից Մարդը, Asbarez, (Armenian), by Ani Tadevosyan, January 13, 2016
- Abstre Sanat Akımı, Soyut Resim, Abstract, 2016
- Gallereo Magazine, The Newest Art Movement You've Never Heard of, Nov. 20, 2015
- CaliforniaNewswire, New Art Movement, Excessivism, is a Commentary on Economic Materialism, Nov. 02, 2015
- Miemi Herald, Excessivism is Best Kept Secret in the Art World, Nov. 02, 2015
- Downtown News, Excessivism Manifesto, September 28, 2015, page 10
- The Huffington Post, Excessivism: Irony, *Imbalance and a New Rococo, by Shana Nys Dambrot, art critic, curator, September 23, 2015
- Effetto Arte, July/August, 2015
- Bare Hill Publishing, The State of Art – Installation & Site Specific #2 | Bare Hill Publishing Installation & Site Specific #2, 2015, Hardcover : ISBN 978-1-909825-15-4
- Asbarez, Ani Tadevosyan, May 15, 2015
- Artweek LA May 13, 2015
- Reuters, Why Donald Trump's Bid for Presidency Related to New Art Movement is Essential? Artist Kaloust Guedel Explains, Dec. 14, 2015
- «Excess The New Norm» Գալուստ Գեոդելի Նկարչական Գործերի Անհատական Ցուցահանդէսը, Asbarez, by Ani Tadevosyan, October 29, 2014
- Bienal Internacional De Curitiba 2013 (Exhibition Catalogue), 2013
- Գալուստ Գէօդելի Նկարը Լոնտոնի «Սաաթչի» Ցուցասրահում, Asbarez, by Ani Tadevosyan, August 15, 2013
- Hetq, Saatchi Gallery in London to Display Work of Kaloust Guedel, by Anush Kocharyan, 24 May 2013
- Yerevan Magazine, Nare Garibyan, September/October, 2012
- Eyes On: Abstracts by Blaze Hill Press, page 53
- Armenian Observer, Ruben Amirian, Jan. 11, 2012
- International Dictionary of Artists by World Wide Art Books, 2011
- "L'inhumanité de l'homme envers l'homme : voyage au bout de la nuit" / Exhibition : "Man's Inhumanity to Man : Journey Out of Darkness" April-2010
- New American Paintings, 15th Anniversary edition by Open Studios Press, 2009, cover
- LA Daily News, Susan Abram, April 23, 2009, page 1
- Man's Inhumanity to Men: Journey Out of Darkness ... (Exhibition Catalogue), 2009
- Afisha, Larisa Pilinsky, Nov. - Dec. 2008
- Masters of Today by MOT, 2008
- Trends by MOT, 2008
- GIAF (Exhibition Catalogue), 2008
- BIAF (Exhibition Catalogue), 2008
- The Armenian Mirror-Spectator, March 1, 2008
- The Armenian Reporter, March 1, 2008
- Glendale News-Press, Art:the remix - Four artists will display works in New Mixed Media show at Brand Library and Art Galleries, By Joyce Rudolph Oct. 07, 2006
- Peter Frank, "Pick of the Week: New Mixed Media," LA Weekly, 2006
- Panorama, May 28, 2004
- Texas National, Stephen F. Austin State University (Exhibition Catalogue), 2003
- From Ararat To America- Contemporary Armenian Artists /Forest Lawn Museum (Exh. Catalogue), 2003
- Voice of America (Radio Interview in Armenian), July 7, 2003
- News-Press, April 29, 2003
- Los Angeles Independent, April 23, 2003
- The Artists Blue Book by Dunbier, Lonnie Pierson, 2003
- Arts & Entertainment, April 23, 2003
- 17th Annual Greater Midwest International, Central Missouri State University (Exhibition Catalogue), 2002
- The Artists Blue Book by Ask Art, 2001
- New American Paintings by Open Studios Press, December 2000
- Gallery Guide, March 1991
- Artspace, summer 1991
- Artscene, December 1990
- 50th National Midyear Exhibition, The Butler Institute of American Art (Exhibition Catalogue), 1986
