= Live Music Festival =

Annual music festival in Kraków, Poland

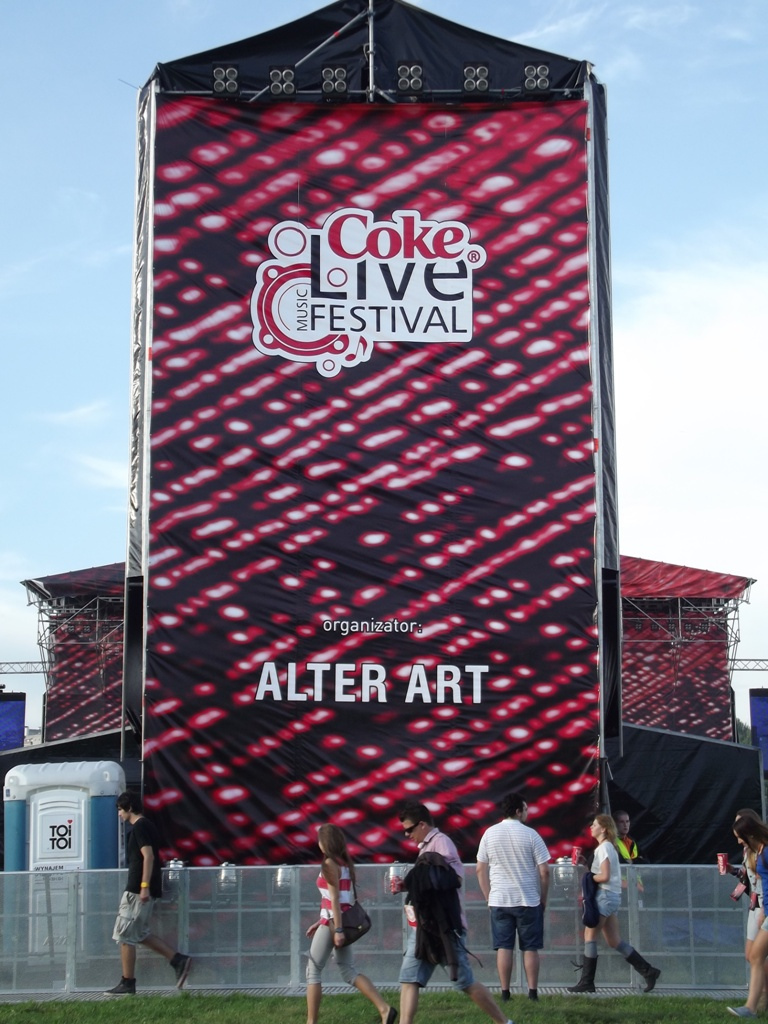
- 2011 Coke Live Music Festival
- Genre: Hip hop, rock, pop, electronic
- Dates: August (2 days)
- Locations: Polish Aviation Museum, Kraków, Poland
- Years active: 2006–present
- Founders: Alter Art
- Website: LiveFestival.pl

Live Music Festival (previously known as Coke Live Music Festival) is a music festival which has been taking place in Kraków, Poland since 2006. The main organizer of the festival is the concert agency Alter Art, and until 2014 the festival's principal sponsor was the Coca-Cola Company. In April 2014, it was announced that the festival has a new sponsor, and the next edition was organized in Summer 2015, after a one-year break.

From 2006 to 2008, the festival was held at the Wisła Kraków Stadium. In 2009, its location moved to the Polish Aviation Museum airport. The festival is held in August and last two days—with the exceptions of the 2006 edition (lasting one day, in September) and the 2009 edition (three days).

Coke Live Music Festival usually features more hip-hop artists than other large Polish music festivals, such as Open'er Festival and Orange Warsaw Festival. However, in 2013 the main focus was put on mainstream rock artists and it was the first Coke Live Music Festival edition not head-lined by an American hip-hop star.

In 2009, Coke Live Music Festival was nominated in the Best Overseas Festival category at the UK Festival Awards.

In 2015 festival came back with new name, Kraków Live Festival, in the new place, Błonia, and in new form. From this year festival presents more alternative music and the stages are placed in tents.

The 2020 and 2021 editions were cancelled due to the coronavirus pandemic. The festival returned in 2022. The 2023 and 2024 editions were also cancelled; organizers cited logistical and organizational difficulties in securing a suitable new festival space for the 2024 edition.

== Organization of the festival ==
There are three kinds of tickets available for sale: two-days tickets for the whole festival, two-days tickets with campsite, and one-day tickets. Ticket are changed into wrist-band at special points (at the campsite entrance, at the main entrance to the festival and at the entrance from the direction of general parking). Band-wrists serve as proof of a ticket's ownership and are checked by security guards, they must not be removed during the entire festival, as the removal makes the wristband invalid.

A tent campsite is set up next to the festival area. In 2012, it could accommodate up to 4 thousand people. The campsite is only accessible to people who purchased the camping area reservation ticket.

== Artists ==
=== 2006 ===
Wisła Kraków Stadium, Kraków, Poland

9 September:
Jay-Z, Shaggy, ~~Sugababes~~ (cancelled), Tatiana Okupnik, Reni Jusis, Vavamuffin, Numer Raz, DJ Deszczu Strugi, EastWest Rockers

=== 2007 ===
Wisła Kraków Stadium, Kraków, Poland

24–25 August:
Main Stage: Rihanna, Akon, Faithless, Lily Allen, Common, Maleo Reggae Rockers, Pinnawella, Tomek Makowiecki
Coke Stage: Brainstorm, S.U.N, Saules Kliosas, O.S.T.R., Molesta Ewenement, Łąki Łan, Łona i Webber, Boogie Mafia, Baron, Plazmatikon
Burn Stage: Mosquito, Boogie Mafia, Igor, Cbass & Mikobene, Wroobel

=== 2008 ===
Muzeum Lotnictwa, Kraków, Poland

22–23 August:
Timbaland, Sean Paul, Missy Elliott, Kaiser Chiefs, The Prodigy, Sokół feat. Pono, Pezet, Indios Bravos, Afromental, The Car Is on Fire, Angelo Mike, Neverafter.

=== 2009 ===
Polish Aviation Museum airport, Kraków, Poland

20 August:
Main Stage: We Call It a Sound, James, The Streets, The Killers
Other stages: Kumka Olik, Coma

21 August:
Main Stage: O.S.T.R., Lupe Fiasco, Gentleman, 50 Cent
Other stages: Warszafski Deszcz, Łąki Łan, Junior Stress & Sun El Band, June

22 August:
Main Stage: Abradab, Madcon, Shaggy, Nas
Other stages: 2cztery7, Ten Typ Mes, Marika, EastWest Rockers, Vavamuffin

=== 2010 ===
Polish Aviation Museum airport, Kraków, Poland

20 August:
Main Stage: Sofa, N.E.R.D, Thirty Seconds to Mars, The Chemical Brothers
Coke Stage: Rotten Bark, CF98, donGURALesko, L.Stadt
Burn Stage: Spox, V/A Team, Sorry, Ghettoblasters, Plastic vs. Pono, Mentalcut

21 August:
Main Stage: Muchy, The Big Pink, Panic! at the Disco, Muse
Coke Stage: The Natural Born Chillers, Irena, Eldo, Fox
Burn Stage: Buszkers, Zeepy Zep, Duofonk, Mosqitoo, Last Robots

=== 2011 ===
Polish Aviation Museum airport, Kraków, Poland

19 August:
Main Stage: You Me at Six, White Lies, The Kooks, Interpol
Coke Stage: Vallium, Out of Tune, Kid Cudi, Parias
Burn Stage: Burn Studios, Olivia Anna Livki, Maximilian Skiba

20 August:
Main Stage: Pablopavo i Ludziki, Everything Everything, Editors, Kanye West
Coke Stage: Popkultura, Fonovel, Łona Weber & the Pimps, Gooral
Burn Stage: Burn Studios, Club Collab, Rubber Dots, Envee

=== 2012 ===
Polish Aviation Museum airport, Kraków, Poland

11 August:
The Killers, The Roots, Kim Nowak, Cool Kids of Death, Mystery Jets, Fair Weather Friends, KAMP!, Pezet & Małolat

12 August:
Placebo, Snoop Dogg, Tabasko, Muchy, Crystal Fighters, Spector, Keira Is You, Azari & III

=== 2013 ===
Polish Aviation Museum airport, Kraków, Poland

9 August:
Main Stage: Mela Koteluk, Brodka, Bisz B.O.K Live Band, Biffy Clyro, Franz Ferdinand
Cracow Stage: Magnificent Muttley, Regina Spektor, Dawid Podsiadło

10 August:
Main Stage: Marika & Spokoarmia, The Cribs, Wu-Tang Clan, Florence and the Machine
Cracow Stage: Łagodna Pianka, Ras Luta, Très.b, Katy B

=== 2015 ===
Błonia, Kraków, Poland

20 August:
Main Stage: Foals, The Maccabees, Viet Cong, Kamp!
Cracow Stage: Ratatat, Low Roar, Aurora, Taco Hemingway

21 August:
Main Stage: Kendrick Lamar, TV On The Radio, Wild Beasts, Rasmentalism
Cracow Stage: Future Islands, MØ, Georgia, Bokka

22 August:
Main Stage: Rudimental, O.S.T.R.

=== 2016 ===
19 August::
Main Stage: Terrific Sunday, Damian Marley, Sia, Massive Attack + Young Fathers:
Cracow Stage: Coals, Algiers, Julia Marcell, Natalia Nykiel

20 August::
Main Stage: Jóga, The Neighbourhood, Róisin Murphy, The Chemical Brothers:
Cracow Stage: The Dumplings, Hey, Cage The Elephant, Kortez

21 August::
Main Stage: Muse

=== 2017 ===
18 August::
Main Stage: Birdy, Travis Scott, Alt-J, Ellie Goulding:
Cracow Stage: Bovska, Piotr Zioła, Pablopavo i Ludziki, Ten Typ Mes

19 August::
Main Stage: Pezet, Nick Murphy, Wiz Khalifa, Lana Del Rey:
Cracow Stage: Holak, Ralph Kaminski, Xxanaxx, Rejjie Snow

=== 2018 ===
17 August::
Main Stage: Sonbird, Die Antwoord, Stormzy, Kendrick Lamar:
Cracow Stage: Mery Spolsky, Daria Zawiałow, Unknown Mortal Orchestra, Bass Astral x Igo

19 August::
Main Stage: Linia Nocna, Jessie Ware, A$AP Rocky, Martin Garrix:
Cracow Stage: Jan-rapowanie, Headie One, Kamp!, Sokół

=== 2019 ===
16 August:
Main Stage: Macklemore, DJ Snake, Ski Mask The Slump God, Krzysztof Zalewski, ~~Banks~~ (cancelled):
Kraków Stage: Tuzza, Marcelina, Aurora, Natalia Nykiel

17 August::
Main Stage: Post Malone, Calvin Harris, Years & Years, Rosalie.:
Kraków Stage: Masego, PRO8L3M, Kacperczyk, Król

=== 2020 ===
cancelled due to the coronavirus pandemic

=== 2021 ===
cancelled due to the coronavirus pandemic

=== 2022 ===
19 August:
Main Stage: Future, Lewis Capaldi, Taco Hemingway, Young Leosia
Kraków Stage: Mimi Webb, Julia Wieniawa, Kacperczyk, Oki

20 August:
Main Stage: Halsey, Ava Max, Anne-Marie, Jan-Rapowanie
Kraków Stage: Parcels, White 2115, Kinny Zimmer, Rosalie.
