= Królicki =

Family name

Królicki (masculine), Królicka (feminine) is a Polish surname derived from any of locations named "Królik", such as Królik Polski or Królik Włoski. The Yiddish variants of the surname include Krolitzki or Krolizky. Other variants: Krolitski/Krolitsky. Notable people with the surnames include:

- Brian Krolicki (born 1960), American businessman and politician
- Ken Krolicki (born 1996), Japanese-American footballer
- Shelly Krolitzky (born 1999), Israeli tennis player
- Stanisław Królicki (1893-1939) Polish military commander

== See also ==
- Krolik
