= Boos Bros. Cafeteria =

Cafeteria chain based in Los Angeles

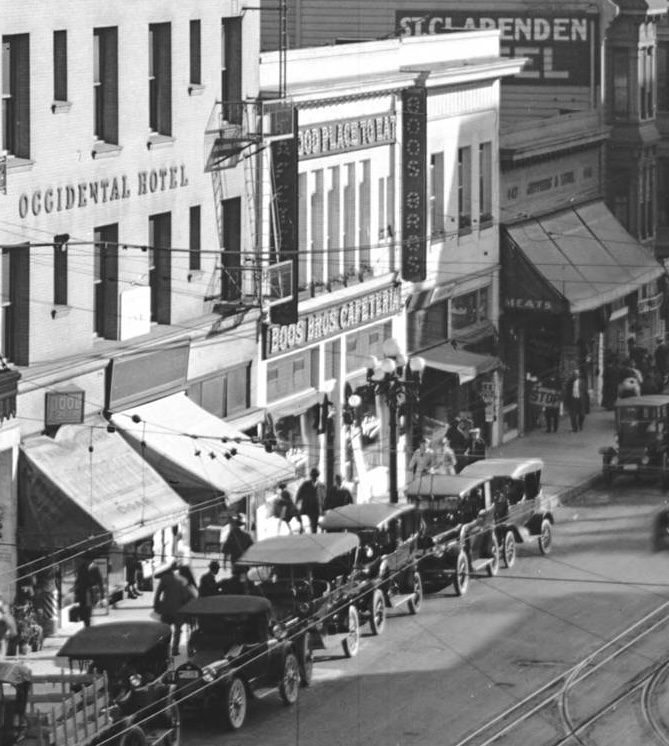
Boos Bros. Cafeteria at 436–438 S. Hill Street in the 1910s

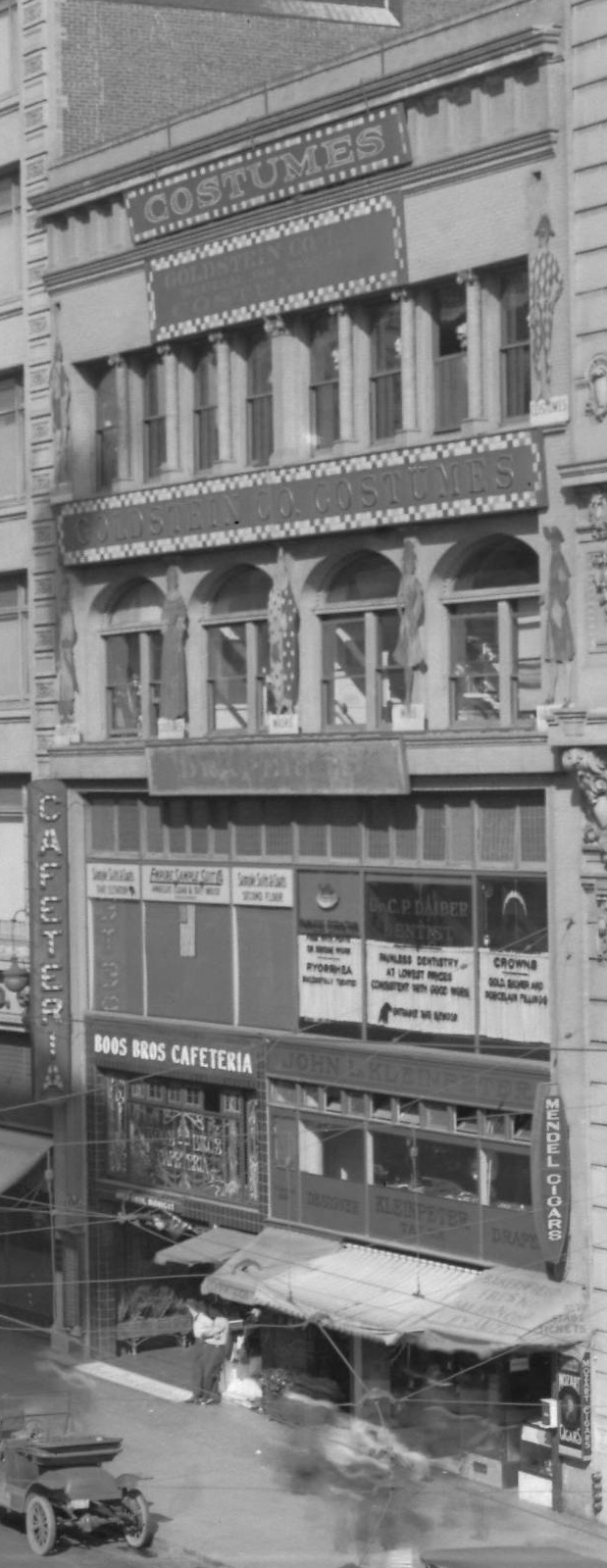
Boos Bros. (later Clifton's Brookdale) Cafeteria at 648 S. Broadway across from Bullock's, c. 1917

The Boos Bros. Cafeteria (Boos Brothers Cafeteria) was a prominent chain of cafeterias based in Los Angeles. It gained national notoriety from 1906 until 1927 when Clifton's Cafeteria acquired several locations. Boos Bros. then reopened in 1935, operating through the late 1950s.

As of 1915 it claimed to serve 40,000 meals a day across its four locations. Four- to seven-piece orchestras entertained patrons with music, and waiting rooms included telephones, writing materials, newspapers and magazines. In that year its locations included:

- 328–330 S. Broadway
- 648 S. Broadway (later Clifton's Brookdale Cafeteria)
- 436–438 S. Hill Street between 4th and 5th streets across from the Pacific Electric Railway Subway Terminal Building. This location was open in 1934 as Boos Bros. Buffet Grill.
- Main Street between 8th and 9th streets (opened 1915)
- San Francisco location

Additional locations included:

- Boos Bros. Coffee Shop, 319 W. Fifth Street (open as of 1933)
- Boos Bros. Paramount Cafeteria, 530 S. Hill Street, across Pershing Square from The Biltmore hotel, opened November 20, 1935, demolished in 1960.

The family retired in 1927, but some of the cafeterias continued to operate under new management. To attract patrons during the Great Depression, as of 1932 they offered "all you can eat for 45 cents" ($10.62 in 2025).

The family re-entered the business in 1935, opening the Paramount Cafeteria.
