= Muchy (band) =

Polish rock band

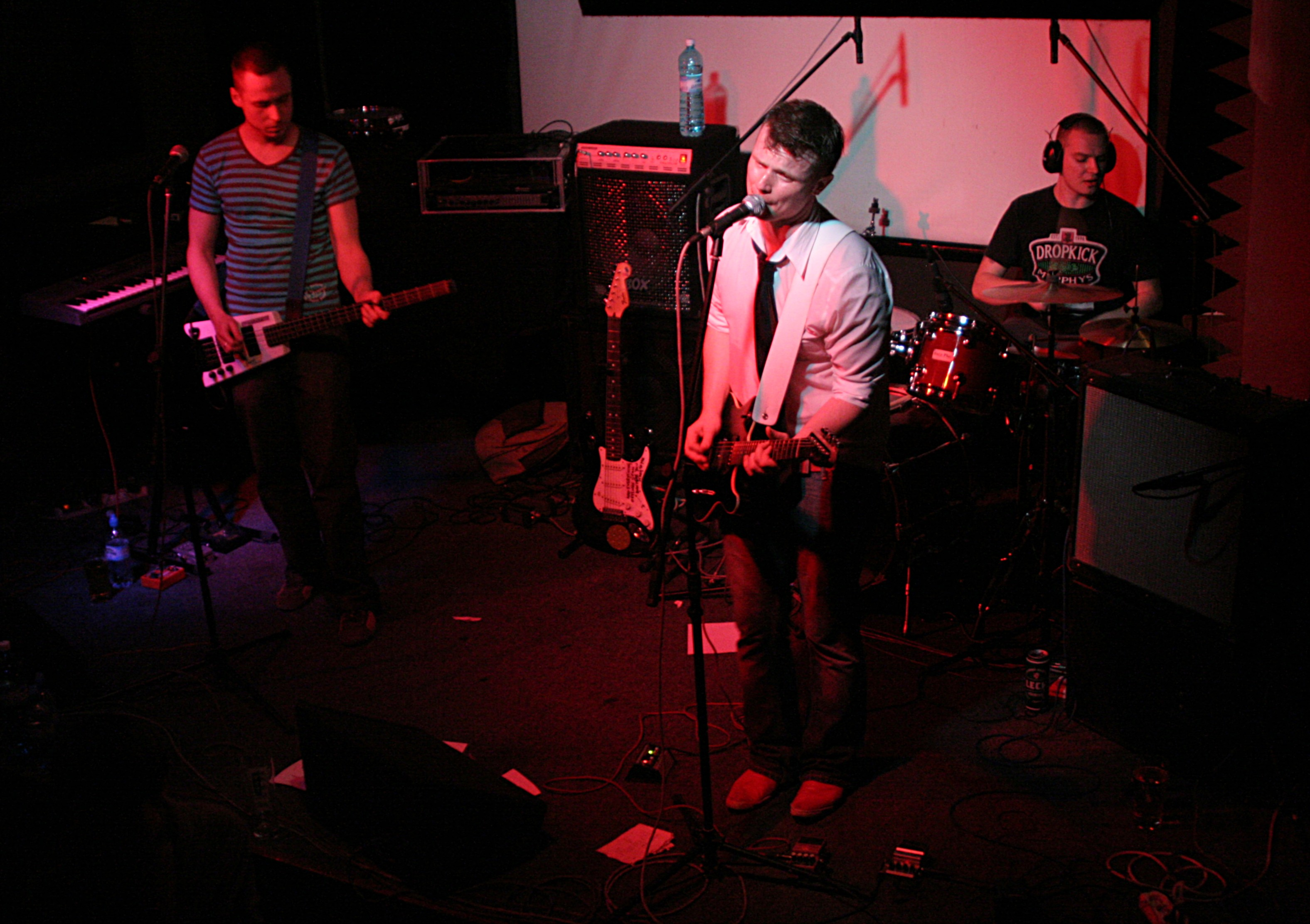
- Muchy in concert (2007)

Background information
- Origin: Poznań, Poland
- Genres: Rock, alternative rock
- Years active: 2004-present
- Labels: Polskie Radio, Sony Music Entertainment Poland, Universal Music Poland
- Members: Michał Wiraszko; Szymon Waliszewski; Tomasz Skórka; Damian Pielka; Krzysztof Zalewski
- Past members: Piotr Maciejewski
- Website: www.muchy.net

Muchy is a Polish rock band. It was founded in 2004 by Michał Wiraszko, Piotr Maciejewski and Szymon Waliszewski. The band's current line-up includes Wiraszko, Waliszewski, Tomasz Skórka, Damian Pielka and Krzysztof Zalewski.

To this day, Muchy have released three critically acclaimed studio albums: Terroromans (2007), Notoryczni debiutanci (2010) and Chcecicospowiedziec (2012). They have received many awards and nominations, including two Fryderyk nominations. The band has performed on main stages of most important Polish festivals. It is the first Polish band that has ever performed on the main stage of Open'er Festival twice.

== History ==
=== Early years and Terroromans (2004–2008) ===
The band Muchy was founded in 2004 by Michał Wiraszko (lead vocals, guitar, keyboards), Piotr Maciejewski (guitar, vocals, keyboards) and Szymon Waliszewski (drums) in Poznań. In 2005, the first song ever recorded by Muchy, a cover of "Nieprzytomna z bólu" by Polish band Partia, was featured on a compilation album Tribute to Partia.

In 2006, the band was called a music discovery of the year by music magazine Machina and Polskie Radio Program III ("Trójka"). It was also referred to as "the best Polish band without an album released" on multiple occasions. The band's debut single "Miasto doznań" reached No.7 on the Lista Przebojów Programu Trzeciego chart in May 2007.

On 19 November 2007, Muchy's debut album Terroromans was released through Polskie Radio label. The album was well received by music critics, with some of them saying it was "new quality in Polish music" and "the most important debut [album] of the decade". Listeners of Trójka voted Terroromans the Album of the Year and Muchy the Band of the Year. The band also won at Pulp magazine's "Miazga 2007" awards in three categories: Band of the Year, Album of the Year (Terroromans) and Song of the Year ("Miasto doznań"). Głos Wielkopolski awarded the band with "Medal Młodej Sztuki 2007" ("Young Art's Medal").

The band was joined by Tomasz Skórka (bass guitar) in January 2008. In 2008, Muchy were nominated in the category Rock Album of the Year at Eska Music Awards, for the Fryderyk award in the category New Face of Fonography, and for Aktivist magazine's Nocne Marki award in the category Band of the Year.

In the first two years following the release of their debut album, Muchy went on three concert tours and played on major Polish festivals, including Open'er Festival (a concert on the main stage on 4 July 2008), Jarocin Festival, Seven Festival in Węgorzewo, Cracow Screen Festival and Off Festival.

=== Notoryczni debiutanci (2009–2011) ===
In October 2009, Muchy started working on their second album with music producer Marcin Bors, who had previously worked with Kasia Nosowska, her band Hey and Gaba Kulka. The album titled Notoryczni debiutanci was released on 8 March 2010 through Sony Music Poland. The first single from the album, "Przesilenie", peaked at No.1 on Lista Przebojów Programu Trzeciego, as well as on music charts of Radio Merkury and Radio Afera.

In 2010, the band played over 70 concerts and was the first Polish band to play on the main stage at Open'er Festival for the second time. In the Summer of 2010, they also performed on main stages of Coke Live Music Festival, Jarocin Festival, Off Festival and Seven Festival in Węgorzewo.

In February 2011, the founding member Piotr Maciejewski left Muchy to pursue solo career. He was replaced by guitarist Damian Pielka, who was previously performing with Lech Janerka for a few years.

In 2011, Muchy received their second nomination to Fryderyk award for their album Notoryczni debiutanci in the category Album of the Year - Alternative. The record was also chosen the Album of the Year by portal uwolnijmuzyke.pl. In Autumn 2011, the band members were featured in Polish edition of the popular MTV show Pimp My Ride, in which their concert bus was restored.

=== Chcecicospowiedziec (2012-present) ===
In 2011, the band released a single "Nie przeszkadzaj mi, bo tańczę" to promote their next record. The record Chcecicospowiedziec was released on 18 September 2012 through Universal Music Poland as a double album, with the second disc containing a mockumentary about the band. The record was produced by Marcin Bors and recorded in Wrocław and Srebrna Góra.

In 2012, the band was joined by Krzysztof Zalewski (guitar, keyboards), who won the second season of the Polish edition of hit TV show Idol in 2003.

== Musical style ==
According to Polish radio station Eska Rock, Muchy represent a music style called "new rock revolution". Their musical inspirations include bands like The Smiths, The Cure, Interpol, Bloc Party, The Strokes or Franz Ferdinand. The band members also mention bands like The Velvet Underground, Modest Mouse, Guided by Voices or the famous Polish band Republika.

== Band members ==
=== Current members ===
- Michał Wiraszko - lead vocals, guitar, keyboards (2004–present)
- Szymon Waliszewski - drums (2004–present)
- Tomasz Skórka - bass guitar (2008–present)
- Damian Pielka - guitar (2011–present)
- Krzysztof Zalewski - guitar, keyboards (2012–present)

=== Past members ===
- Piotr Maciejewski - guitar, vocals, keyboards (2004–2011)

== Discography ==
=== Albums ===
Title	Album details	Peak chart positions
Title	Album details	POL
Terroromans	Released: 19 November 2007; Label: Polskie Radio	19
Notoryczni debiutanci	Released: 8 March 2010; Label: Sony Music Poland	13
Chcecicospowiedziec	Released: 18 September 2012; Label: Universal Music Poland	35

=== Singles and other charted songs ===
Title	Year	Peak chart positions	Album
Title	Year	LP3	Album
"Miasto doznań"	2007	7	Terroromans
"21 dni"	2007	10	Terroromans
"Galanteria"	2007	8	Terroromans
"Najważniejszy dzień"	2008	14	Terroromans
"Papierowy księżyc" (with Halina Frąckowiak)	2008	21	Non-album release
"Przesilenie"	2010	1	Notoryczni debiutanci
"Zimne kraje"	2010	29	Notoryczni debiutanci
"Notoryczni debiutanci"	2010	48	Notoryczni debiutanci
"Nie przeszkadzaj mi, bo tańczę"	2012	49	Chcecicospowiedziec
"Zamarzam"	2012	34	Chcecicospowiedziec

== Awards and nominations ==
=== Fryderyk ===
Year	Nominee / work	Award	Result
2008	Muchy	New Face of Fonography	Nominated
2011	Notoryczni debiutanci	Album of the Year - Alternative	Nominated

=== Eska Music Awards ===
Year	Nominee / work	Award	Result
2008	Terroromans	Rock Album of the Year	Nominated
