= Łąki Łan =

Polish band

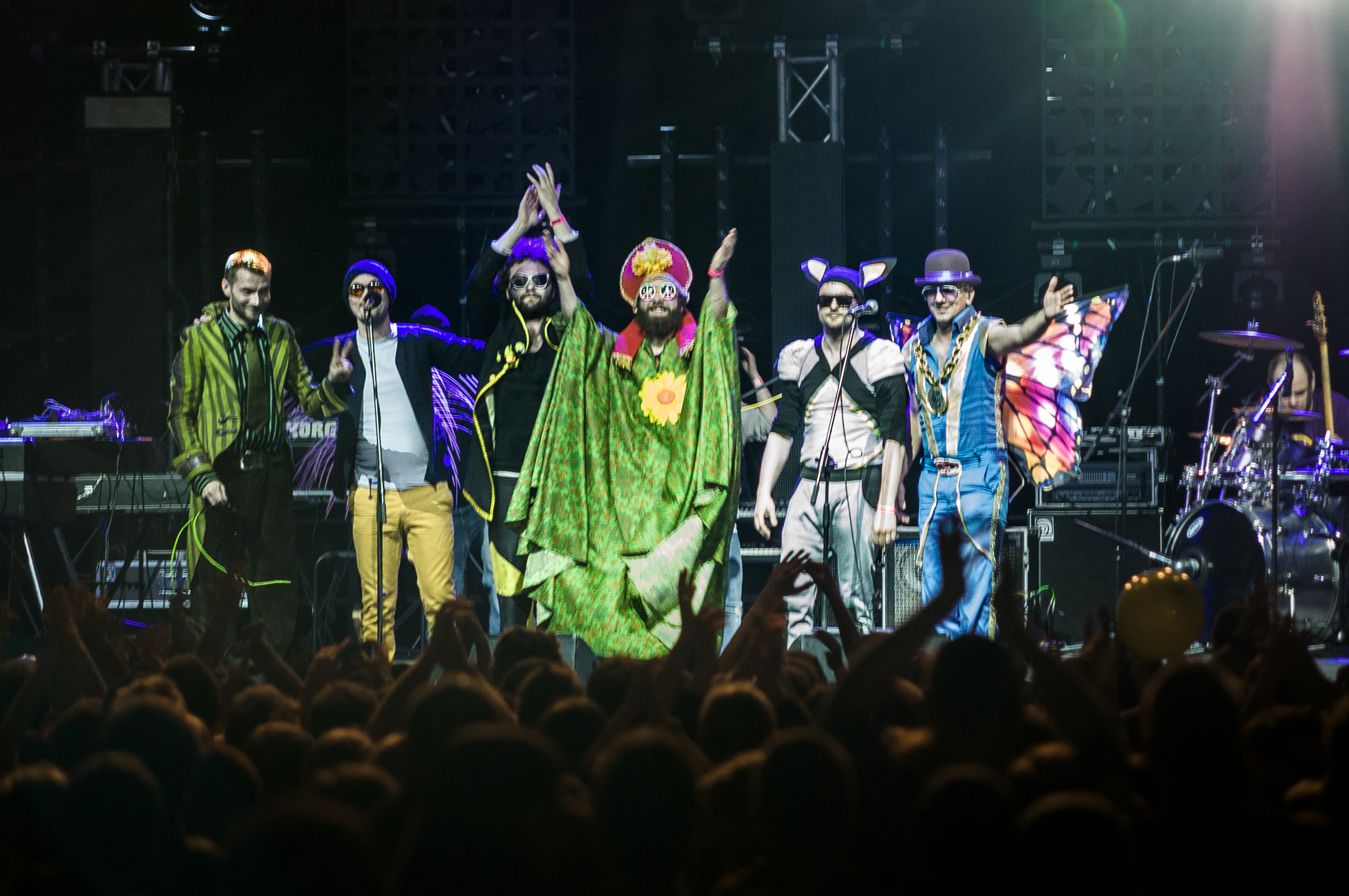
- Łąki Łan in 2013

Background information
- Origin: Poland
- Genres: Funk, punk rock, house, trip hop, drum'n'bass
- Years active: 2002-present
- Labels: EMI Music Poland
- Members: Jarosław Jóźwik (Poń Kolny); Michał Chęć (Niesforny Bonk); Bartek Królik (Zając Cokictokloc); Marek Piotrowski (Jeżus Marian); Piotr Koźbielski (Mega Motyl); Piotr Pacak (Boykot)
- Past members: Włodzimierz Dembowski (Paprodziad)
- Website: lakilan.pl

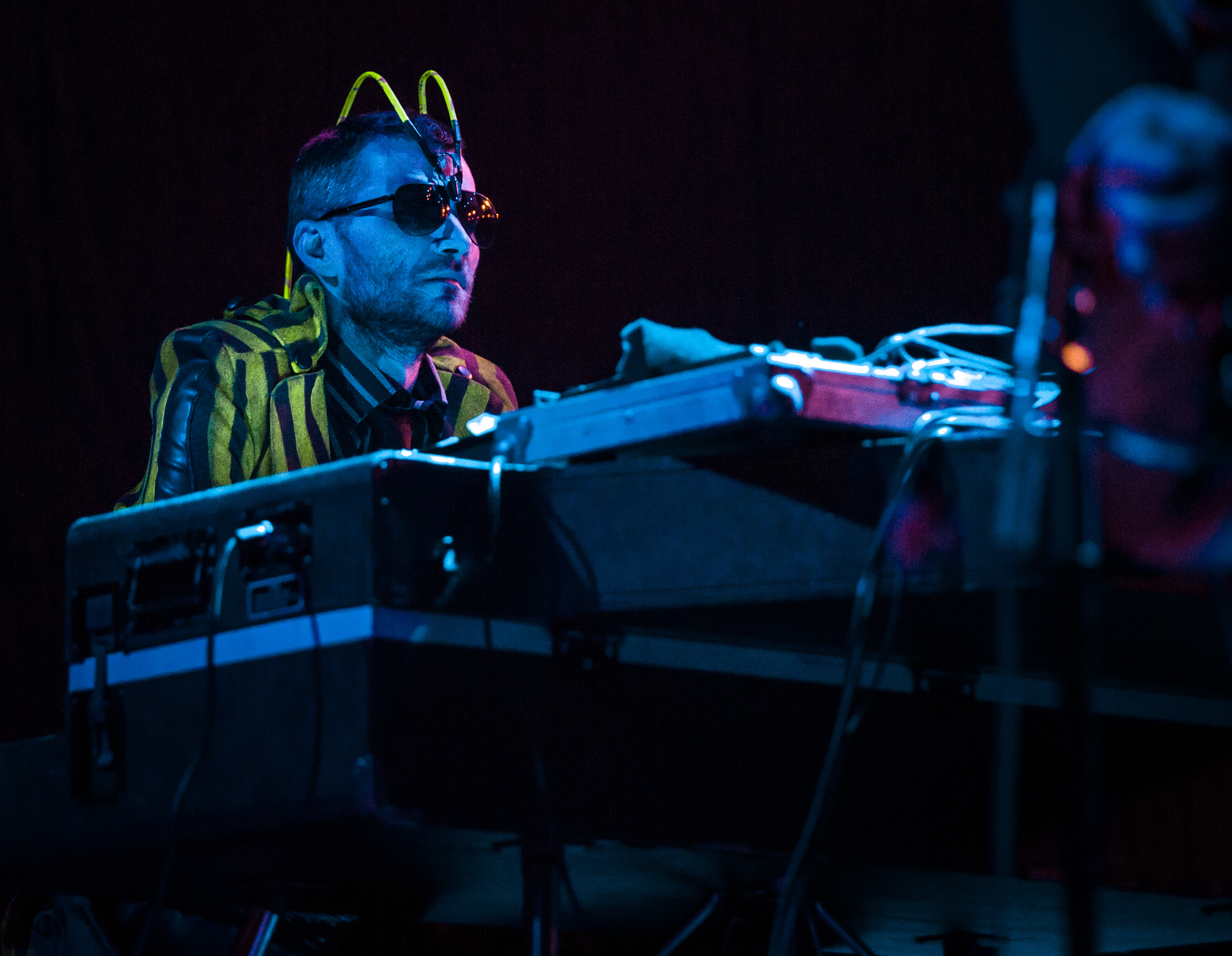
Keyboardist Jarosław Jóźwik

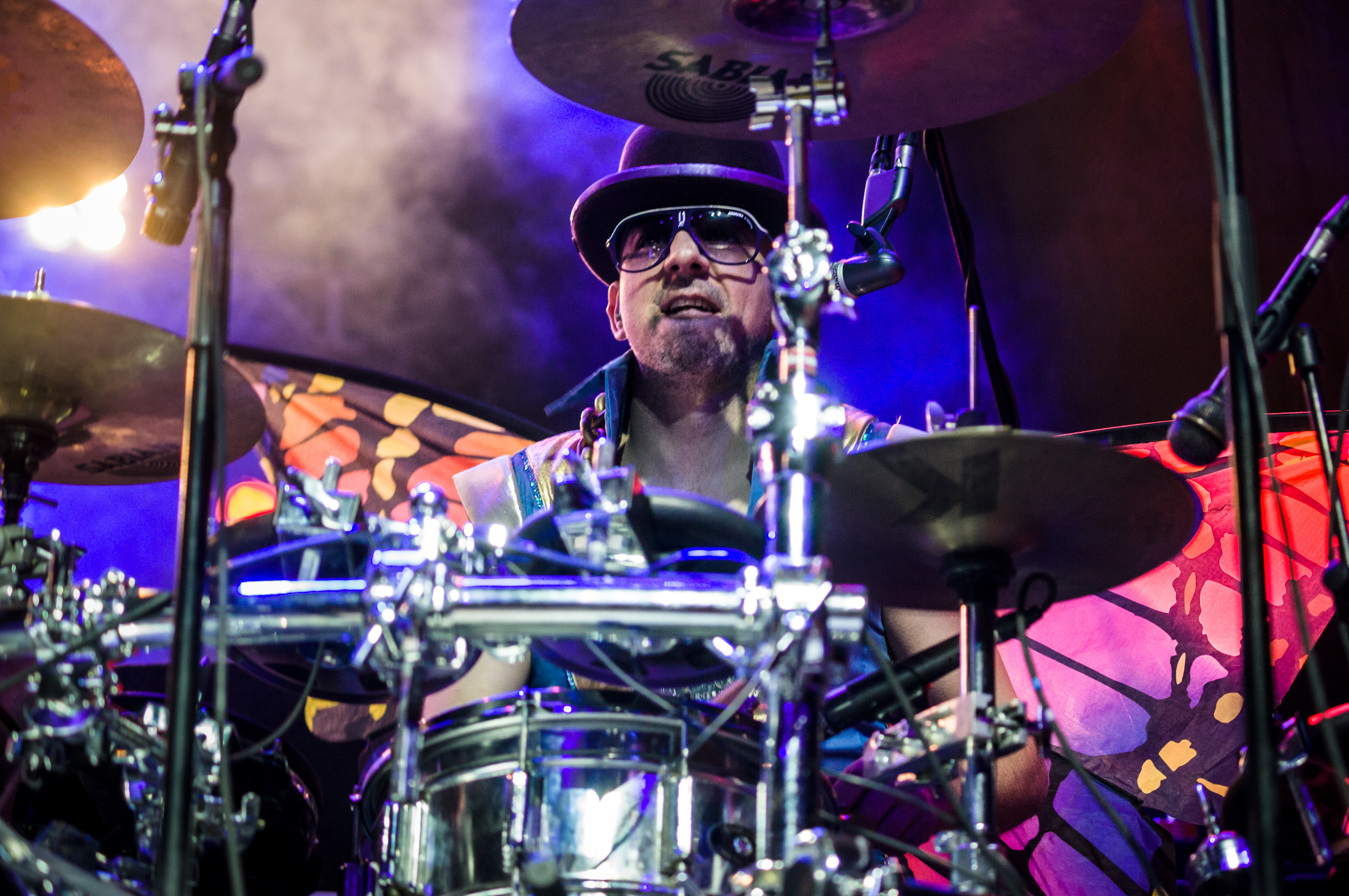
Drummer Piotr Koźbielski

Łąki Łan (Polish: [wɔ̃ki wan]) (Polish: Meadow's Field) is a Polish band consisting of Jarosław Jóźwik, Michał Chęć, Piotr Koźbielski, Piotr Pacak, and former Sistars musicians Bartek Królik and Marek Piotrowski. Its style is a mixture of "punk and funky" or "Łąki Funk", as the band calls it. Hailed one of the best concert groups in Poland, the band is known for their energetic, colorful, humorous shows and imaginative concert outfits that resemble various insects.

== History ==
Łąki Łan was founded in 2002, though the very beginnings of the band's formation might be dated as far back as 1999, when Mega Motyl and Poń Kolny, back in high school, were overheard by Paprodziad (who is one year their junior) talking about their plans to start up a band. Paprodziad followed them later to a place where the older boys were meeting up and showed them his poems. By the time the band's debut album Łąki Łan was released on 12 August 2005, it had played over 100 concerts. The album, which was much anticipated, was described by some reviewers as a mix of funk, house, trip hop and drum'n'bass.

The band's second album, ŁąkiŁanda, was released on 8 May 2009 through EMI Music Poland. Grzegorz Dusza of Audio magazine wrote that "Łąki Łan are having a lot of fun, writing ridiculous lyrics with an ecological message. But the base of the music is a solid, funky groove with strong bass, expressive drums, rock guitar and pseudo-rapped lyrics. (...) The band also has an electronic side and their drum'n'bass tracks could easily be played in clubs." In February 2010, the album was nominated for the Fryderyk award in the category "Album of the Year – Alternative".

Łąki Łan's third album, Armanda, was released on 13 November 2012 through EMI Music Poland. Sebastian Rerak of Onet.pl rated the album 7.5/10 and wrote in his review: "Madmen dresses like degenerated fairytale characters warned that the new album may be a surprise. They didn't lie. Armanda has funk pulse, but not always connected with rock expression. A disco ball is spinning just as often as the smoke is coming out of a guitar."

Łąki Łan has performed at some of the most important Polish music festivals, including Open'er Festival (2007, 2009, 2010 and 2013), Coke Live Music Festival (2007 and 2009) and Przystanek Woodstock (2010, 2011 and 2017).

In March 2022, after Paprodziad questioned COVID-19 pandemic and the occurrence of 2022 Russian aggression against Ukraine and claimed the media covered the latter subject as a part of conspiracy, he was removed from the band by the other members.

== Band members ==
- Jarosław Jóźwik ("Poń Kolny") – keyboards
- Michał Chęć ("Niesforny Bonk") – guitar, vocals
- Bartek Królik ("Zając Cokictokloc") – bass guitar, keyboards, electric Guitar, vocals
- Marek Piotrowski ("Jeżus Marian") – keyboards
- Piotr Koźbielski ("Mega Motyl") – drums, vocals
- Piotr Pacak ("Boykot") – drums, keyboards, vocals

=== Former members ===
- Włodzimierz Dembowski ("Paprodziad") – vocals, songwriter – 1999–2004, 2005-2022 (removed from the band by the other members)
- Krzysztof "Cyberbiedron" Wieszak - keyboards
- Stanisław "Poważka" Wróbel - Bass guitar

== Discography ==
=== Studio albums ===
Title	Album details	Peak chart positions
Title	Album details	POL
Łąki Łan	Released: 12 August 2005; Label: OFFmusic/Fonografika	—
ŁąkiŁanda	Released: 8 May 2009; Label: EMI Music Poland	—
Armanda	Released: 13 November 2012; Label: EMI Music Poland	44
Syntonia	Released: 18 November 2016; Label: Pomaton/Warner Music Poland	19
"—" denotes a recording that did not chart.

=== Live albums ===
Title	Album details
Przystanek Woodstock 2011	Released: 6 December 2011; Format: CD/DVD

=== Music videos ===
Song	Year	Album	Director(s)	Source
"Propaganda"	2010	ŁąkiŁanda		
"Big Baton"	2010	ŁąkiŁanda		
"Lovelock"	2012	Armanda	Julia Bui Ngoc	

== Awards and nominations ==
=== Fryderyk ===
Year	Nominee / work	Award	Result
2010	ŁąkiŁanda	Album of the Year – Alternative	Nominated
