= Królik =

Królik is a Polish surname. Notable people with the surname include:

- Bartek Królik, Polish musician of band Łąki Łan
- Golda Krolik (1892–1985), Detroit activist and organizer
- Jacek Królik, Piotr Królik, members of the Polish folk rock group Brathanki
- Kinga Królik (born 1999), Polish steeplechase runner
- Sonja Oberem, née Krolik (born 1973), German athlete, who specialized in the marathon races
