= Out of Tune (band) =

Polish band

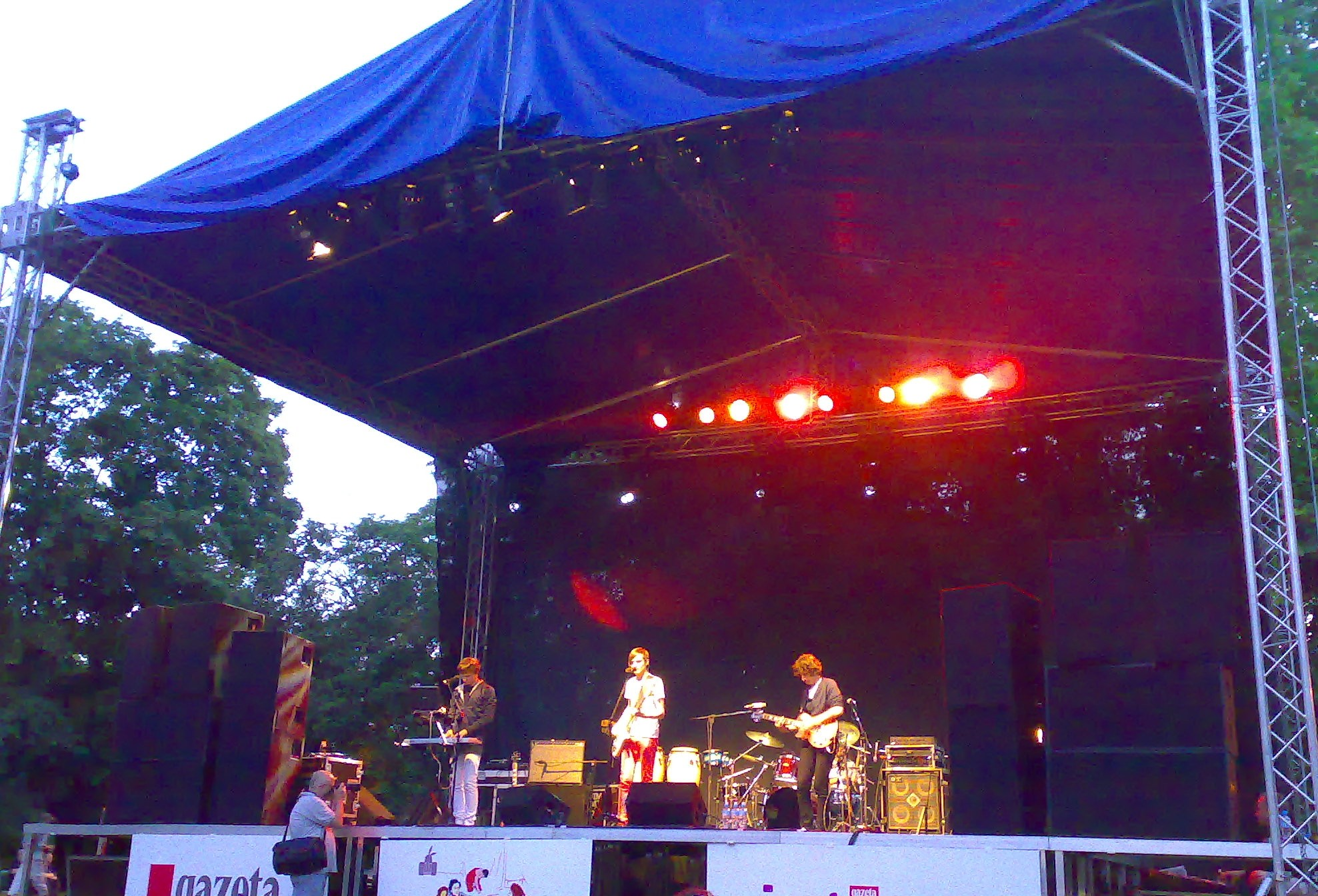
- Out of Tune in concert, 2007

Background information
- Origin: Warsaw, Poland
- Genres: Dance-punk, indie rock
- Years active: 2005–present
- Labels: EMI Music Poland
- Members: Eryk Sarniak; Maciej Sobczyński; Mateusz Gągol; Michał Witkowski
- Website: www.outoftune.pl

Out of Tune is a Polish dance-punk and indie rock band. Their music combines elements of rock, pop and electro. The band was formed in Warsaw in 2005 by a bass player and vocalist Eryk Sarniak, guitarist Maciej Sobczyński and drummer Michał Witkowski. After a year, a band joined Mateusz Gągol, who plays keyboards, guitar, laptop and backing vocals.

== History ==
Their first concert took place in Smok club, Otwock, in 2005. After a few gigs in Warsaw, and in clubs all over Poland, the band decided to enrich their sound by adding keyboards and electronics. In 2006, a keyboard player, Mateusz Gągol joined the group. Since then Out of Tune add electro sounds to their music.

In this year also, a band recorded an EP Killer Pop Machine. It contains 4 songs, and was produced by Adam Wasilkowski, former guitarist of a polish band Buzu Squat. EP Killer Pop Machine was released in a small number of copies, by a band. EP, and single Killer Pop Machine brought more popularity, fans, and interest from media to the band. The band was mentioned and appeared in polish MTV (N-Style program ), Polish Radio, and commercial radio stations, daily newspapers, and magazines. EP Killer Pop Machine received good reviews.

In 2007, Killer Pop Machine appeared on Offensywa 2 - Shoes & Microphones EP compilation, an album published by Polish Radio. In the same year they played on the largest polish international music festival – Heineken Opener Festival on Young Artists Stage.

The band played over 50 gigs all over Poland. They had gigs also in Berlin, and Prague. They supported artists, such as: Junior Boys, Bugz In The Attic, Robots In Disguise.

They played a single role as a band in a film, Jasne Błękitne Okna, directed by Bogusław Linda.

By the end of 2007, the band signed a contract with EMI Music Poland. They started to record their first album the same year. After many months of work, debut album Out of Tune was released on 22 of August 2008.

The first single was "Plastikowy". Its videoclip was directed by Artur Kopp.

== Band members ==
- Eryk Sarniak – vocal, bass guitar
- Maciej Sobczyński – guitar
- Mateusz Gągol – keyboard, guitar, laptop, backing vocals (since 2006)
- Michał Witkowski – drums

== Discography ==
=== Albums ===
- Out of Tune (22 August 2008, EMI Music Poland)

=== EPs ===
- Killer Pop Machine (2006, self-released)

=== Singles ===
- "Plastikowy" (5 August 2008, EMI Music Poland)
- "Refugees" (27 October 2008 EMI Music Poland)

=== Compilations ===
- Offensywa 2 - Shoes & Microphones (EP, 2007, Polskie Radio, Universal Music Group)
