= Los Angeles Downtown News =

Weekly newspaper in Los Angeles, California

- Type: Weekly newspaper
- Format: Long tabloid
- Owner: Times Media Group
- Founded: 1972
- Headquarters: 1264 West First Street; Los Angeles, California 90026; United States
- Circulation: 44,705 weekly in 2011
- Price: Free
- Website: ladowntownnews.com
- Free online archives: cdnc.ucr.edu (2011-2017)

The Los Angeles Downtown News is a free weekly newspaper in Los Angeles, California, serving the Downtown Los Angeles area.

The newspaper focuses on general news with an emphasis on real estate and business along with coverage of the arts scene. It also has occasional historical features by Jay Berman and features in its news coverage photos by Gary Leonard (plus the weekly feature "Take My Picture Gary Leonard" that highlights notable events and local figures cultural and political).

Coverage area is roughly bounded by the Los Angeles River to the north and east (excluding Echo Park), the University of Southern California and Exposition Park to the south and City West to the west.

The paper's masthead in 2001 briefly included entertainment blogger and former Associated Press correspondent Nikki Finke, who was hired as executive editor.

== Coverage area and history ==
From a 2001 Los Angeles Times story about the paper:

"(Founder and editor Sue) Laris was a public school teacher and her then-husband Jim Laris worked for the U.S. Army Corps of Engineers in 1972 when they decided to start their own community newspaper. They targeted downtown because there weren't any other weeklies there at the time. When the couple divorced in 1979, Laris bought her husband's share of the business. Over the years, the newspaper's folksy approach and loyal advertisers sustained it while others succumbed to diminishing readership and the high cost of newsprint. Today, the Downtown News operates on a $1.7 million annual budget."

It publishes more than 40,000 copies every Monday, is audited by VAC. and distributed via newsracks in Downtown Los Angeles, Wilshire Center, Pasadena, Glendale, Hollywood, Los Feliz, Silver Lake and Larchmont Village.

On September 30, 2016, Sue Laris announced online the Los Angeles Downtown News, after 44 years, is for sale. It was sold to Southland Publishing in 2017.

In August 2019, Times Media Group (Arizona) acquired the parent company of Los Angeles Downtown News, Southland Publishing, which was focused on several markets in Southern California. The acquisition included eight print publications and associated digital properties. The five newspapers acquired at that time included LA Downtown News Ventura County Reporter, The Argonaut (Santa Monica), Pasadena Weekly, and San Diego CityBeat. The three magazines acquired included Ventana Monthly, Playa Vista Direct and Arroyo Magazine. The acquisition is notable as it marks Times Media Group’s sizable expansion of its portfolio of publications and a move into the California market.
