= Face Off: Game Face =

American reality television game show

- Genre: Reality
- Presented by: McKenzie Westmore
- Judges: Ve Neill (2017–present); Rick Baker (2017–present)
- Country of origin: United States
- Original language: English
- No. of seasons: 1
- No. of episodes: 7

Production
- Executive producers: Michael Agbabian; Dwight D. Smith; Ian Mallahan
- Production locations: Los Angeles, California

Original release
- Network: Syfy
- Release: August 22 – October 3, 2017

Face Off: Game Face is an American reality television game show on the Syfy cable network in which make-up artists compete against one another to create character make-ups such as those found in sci-fi and horror films. Face Off: Game Face is a spin-off of Syfy's Face Off and is similar in format to Food Network's Chopped. Each episode features four Face Off all-stars who compete head-to-head through three rounds with one artist being eliminated after each challenge until a final winner is chosen and receives US$10,000. The challenges are reminiscent of the Foundation Challenges - short, makeup focused challenges - that preceded the main challenges in Face Off which were phased out in the later seasons. The show's host, actress McKenzie Westmore is joined by Academy Award-winning makeup artist Ve Neill and Rick Baker as the series judges with a third guest judge that rotates each episode. Special effects makeup artist Glenn Hetrick, and Emmy Award-winning makeup artist Eryn Krueger Mekash have served as guest judges.

== Season 1 contestants ==
Name	Hometown	Appeared In Season	Episode
Roy Wooley	Tucker, Georgia	Season 3, 5	Episode 1
George Schminky	San Francisco, California	Season 6	Episode 1
Faina Rudshteyn	Brooklyn, New York City, New York	Season 12	Episode 1
Jasmine Ringo	Las Vegas, Nevada	Season 9, 11	Episode 1
Tate Steinsiek	Brooklyn, New York City, New York	Season 1, 5	Episode 2
Adolfo Barreto Rivera	Las Vegas, Nevada	Season 5	Episode 2
Melissa Ebbe	Milwaukee, Wisconsin	Season 10, 11	Episode 2
Kelly Harris	Columbus, Ohio	Season 8	Episode 2
Alana Rose Schiro	Los Angeles, California	Season 3, 5	Episode 3
Corinne Foster	Los Angeles, California	Season 6	Episode 3
Robert Lindsay	Berlin, Germany	Season 10	Episode 3
Scott Fensterer	Orlando, Florida	Season 9	Episode 3
Miranda Jory	Los Angeles, California	Season 2, 5	Episode 4
Derek Garcia	Miami, Florida	Season 3	Episode 4
George Troester III	Los Angeles, California	Season 7, 11	Episode 4
KC Mussman	Los Angeles, California	Season 12	Episode 4
Melanie "Mel" Licata	Hightstown, New Jersey	Season 10	Episode 5
Heather Henry	Dallas, Texas	Season 2	Episode 5
Drew Talbot	St. Louis, Missouri	Season 7	Episode 5
Niko Gonzalez	San Germán, Puerto Rico	Season 6, 11	Episode 5
Cig Neutron	Los Angeles, California	Season 7, 11	Episode 6
Darla Edin	Minneapolis, Minnesota	Season 8	Episode 6
Nicole Chilelli	Sacramento, California	Season 3	Episode 6
Rashaad Santiago	The Bronx, New York City, New York	Season 6	Episode 6
Angie Davis	Los Angeles, California	New Contestant	Episode 7
Scott Jenkins	Chicago, Illinois	New Contestant	Episode 7
Jonathon Mario	Salt Lake City, Utah	New Contestant	Episode 7
Marie Rose Cruz	New York City, New York	New Contestant	Episode 7

=== Progress ===
Contestant	Episode 1		
Contestant	Round 1	Round 2	Round 3
Jasmine	IN	IN	WIN
Roy	IN	IN	OUT
George	IN	OUT	
Faina	OUT		

Contestant	Episode 2		
Contestant	Round 1	Round 2	Round 3
Tate	IN	IN	WIN
Adolfo	IN	IN	OUT
Melissa	IN	OUT	
Kelly	OUT		

Contestant	Episode 3		
Contestant	Round 1	Round 2	Round 3
Alana	IN	IN	WIN
Corinne	IN	IN	OUT
Scott	IN	OUT	
Robert	OUT		

Contestant	Episode 4		
Contestant	Round 1	Round 2	Round 3
Miranda	IN	IN	WIN
Derek	IN	IN	OUT
KC	IN	OUT	
George	OUT		

Contestant	Episode 5		
Contestant	Round 1	Round 2	Round 3
Mel	IN	IN	WIN
Drew	IN	IN	OUT
Heather	IN	OUT	
Niko	OUT		

Contestant	Episode 6		
Contestant	Round 1	Round 2	Round 3
Darla	IN	IN	WIN
Nicole	IN	IN	OUT
Rashaad	IN	OUT	
Cig	OUT		

Contestant	Episode 7		
Contestant	Round 1	Round 2	Round 3
Angie	1st	1st	WIN
Scott	3rd	2nd	OUT
Jonathon	2nd	OUT	
Marie	OUT		
