= Face Off season 13 =

Face Off
- Season 13
- No. of episodes: 10

Release
- Original network: Syfy
- Original release: June 5 – August 7, 2018

Season chronology
- ← Previous; Season 12

The thirteenth, and final season of the Syfy reality television series Face Off (styled as Face Off: Battle Royale) premiered on June 5, 2018. This season features the return of twelve former competitors, who will compete head-to-head against each other throughout the competition.

== Contestants ==
Name	Age	Hometown	Original season	Place finished originally	Place finished
Kayla "Jo" Holland	29	Hilo, Hawaii	1	8th	12-11
Sasha Glasser	26	Orange County, California	7	6th	12-11
Kelly Harris	26	Columbus, Ohio	8	8th	10-9
Yvonne Cox	30	Alberta, Canada	10	5th	10-9
Graham Schofield	33	Boston, Massachusetts	6	6th	8-7
Kevon Ward	30	Rock Springs, Wyoming	9	8th	8-7
Melanie "Mel" Licata	28	Hightstown, New Jersey	10	4th	6-4
Damien Zimmerman	28	Junction City, Kansas	7	8th	6-4
Derek Garcia	37	Miami Lakes, Florida	3	Runner-up	6-4
Jordan Patton	27	Parkersburg, West Virginia	9	4th/5th	Runner-up
Walter Welsh	28	Martinez, California	10	Runner-up	Runner-up
Matt Valentine	39	Austin, Texas	2	4th/5th	Winner

== Recurring people ==
- McKenzie Westmore - Host
- Michael Westmore - Mentor

=== Judges ===
- Ve Neill
- Glenn Hetrick
- Neville Page

== Contestant Progress ==
Contestant	Episode								
Contestant	1	2	3	4	5	6	7	8	9/10
Matt	HIGH‡	IN	HIGH‡	WIN‡	WIN‡	IN	HIGH‡	IN	WINNER
Jordan	IN‡	HIGH‡	IN‡	IN‡	LOW	IN‡	WIN‡	WIN	RUNNER-UP
Walter	IN	WIN‡	IN‡	IN	IN‡	WIN‡	IN	IN	RUNNER-UP
Derek	IN‡	IN‡	IN	IN‡	HIGH‡	HIGH‡	IN‡	OUT	
Damien	IN‡	IN‡	WIN‡	IN	LOW	LOW	LOW	OUT	
Mel	IN	LOW	IN‡	LOW	IN	IN‡	LOW	OUT	
Graham	IN‡	IN	LOW	IN‡	HIGH‡	OUT			
Kevon	LOW	IN‡	IN	HIGH‡	IN	OUT			
Yvonne	LOW	IN‡	IN	OUT					
Kelly	WIN‡	IN	LOW	OUT					
Sasha	IN	OUT							
Jo	IN	OUT							

The contestant won Face Off.
The contestant was a runner-up.
The contestant won a Spotlight Challenge.
The contestant was in the top in the Spotlight Challenge.
The contestant was declared one of the best in the Spotlight Challenge but was not in the running for the win.
The contestant was in the bottom in the Spotlight Challenge.
The contestant was eliminated.
‡ The contestant won their Head to Head Match.

== Episodes ==
No. overall	No. in season	Title	Original release date	U.S. viewers (millions)	18-49 Rating
151	1	"Face Your Fears"	June 5, 2018	N/A	TBA
Spotlight Challenge: In the season 13 premiere, 12 returning artists go head-to-head as to create a mashup of fairy tale creatures with the aesthetics lens of the director Guillermo del Toro.; Battle 1 : Yvonne vs Matt Character : J.M. Barrie's Tinker Bell Winner : Matt Battle 2 : Damien vs Jo Character : Kenneth Grahame's Mr. Toad Winner : Damien Battle 3 : Graham vs Sasha Character : Hans Christian Andersen's Little Mermaid Winner : Graham Battle 4 : Walter vs Kelly Character : Humpty Dumpty Winner : Kelly Battle 5 : Derek vs Kevon Character : J.M. Barrie's Captain Hook Winner : Derek Battle 6 : Jordan vs Mel Character : The Gingerbread man Winner : Jordan Top Looks: Kelly Matt Bottom Looks: Yvonne Kevon Winner: Kelly Guest Judge: Doug Jones
152	2	"Moonlight Monsters"	June 12, 2018	N/A	TBA
Spotlight Challenge: In the first elimination challenge, the artists have to create fun and lighthearted monsters inspired by real life day jobs. Each makeup must contain a gag whereby the monster goes from darling to devilish.; Note : As a winner of the previous challenge, Kelly was helped by Jamie Kelman. Battle 1 : Jordan vs Matt Character : Dentist Winner : Jordan Battle 2 : Kevon vs Kelly Character : Diner Waitress Winner : Kevon Battle 3 : Jo vs Derek Character : Firefighter Winner : Derek Battle 4 : Damien vs Graham Character : Judge Winner : Damien Battle 5 : Yvonne vs Sasha Character : Hairdresser Winner : Yvonne Battle 6 : Walter vs Mel Character : Police Officer Winner : Walter Top Looks: Walter Jordan Bottom Looks: Jo Sasha Mel Winner: Walter Eliminated: Jo Sasha
153	3	"Aztec Aliens"	June 19, 2018	N/A	TBA
Spotlight Challenge: The artists have to create ancient aliens that could have been the inspiration for Aztec Gods.; Battle 1 : Derek vs Matt Character : Tlaloc Winner : Matt Battle 2 : Damien vs Graham Character : Tonatiuh Winner : Damien Battle 3 : Kevon vs Jordan Character : Tezcatlipoca Winner : Jordan Battle 4 : Mel vs Yvonne Character : Xochipilli Winner : Mel Battle 5 : Kelly vs Walter Character : Quetzalcoatl Winner : Walter Top Looks: Damien Matt Bottom Looks: Graham Kelly Winner: Damien
154	4	"Haunted Hotel"	June 26, 2018	N/A	TBA
Spotlight Challenge: In this elimination challenge, the artists have to create the quirky and ghostly staff of a haunted hotel.; Note : As a winner of the previous challenge, Damien was helped by Mike Mekash. Battle 1 : Graham vs Walter Character : Concierge Winner : Graham Battle 2 : Yvonne vs Derek Character : Handyman Winner : Derek Battle 3 : Matt vs Damien Character : Chef Winner : Matt Battle 4 : Mel vs Kevon Character : Maid Winner : Kevon Battle 5 : Kelly vs Jordan Character : Bellhop Winner : Jordan Top Looks: Kevon Matt Bottom Looks: Yvonne Kelly Mel Winner: Matt Eliminated: Yvonne Kelly
155	5	"Death Dealers"	July 3, 2018	N/A	TBA
Spotlight Challenge: The artists have to create makeups based on the thirteenth card of tarot, Death, and based on actual tarot card readings.; Battle 1 : Mel vs Matt Mel's cards : The five of Swords, the nine of Pentacles and The Moon Matt's cards : The Queen of Cups, Strength and the Queen of Swords Winner : Matt Battle 2 : Kevon vs Derek Kevon's cards : The Hierophant, The Tower and the four of Wands reversed Derek's cards : The four of Cups reversed, The Hierophant reversed and the five of Swords Winner : Derek Battle 3 : Walter vs Jordan Walter's cards : The Sun, the nine of Cups and The Magician Jordan's cards : Judgement, the four of Cups and the nine of Cups Winner : Walter Battle 4 : Damien vs Graham Damien's cards : Justice reversed, the six of Wands and the nine of Swords Graham's cards : The six of Wands reversed, the nine of Swords and Judgement Winner : Graham Top Looks: Derek Matt Graham Bottom Looks: Damien Jordan Winner: Matt
156	6	"Divine Dryads"	July 10, 2018	N/A	TBA
Spotlight Challenge: In this elimination challenge, the artists have to create dryad protectors of real life forests.; Note : As a winner of the previous challenge, Matt was helped by Jordu Schell. Battle 1 : Matt vs Derek Location : Dragon's Blood Forest Winner : Derek Battle 2 : Walter vs Graham Location : Painted Forest Winner : Walter Battle 3 : Mel vs Damien Location : Ancient Bristlecone Pine Forest Winner : Mel Battle 4 : Kevon vs Jordan Location : Avenue of the Baobabs Winner : Jordan Top Looks: Derek Walter Bottom Looks: Graham Kevon Damien Winner: Walter Eliminated: Graham Kevon
157	7	"Maritime Monsters"	July 17, 2018	N/A	TBA
Spotlight Challenge: Using images from maps from centuries ago, the artists will create a sea monster to scare and swim, in an underwater challenge.; Battle 1 : Mel vs Derek Winner : Derek Battle 2 : Walter vs Matt Winner : Matt Battle 3 : Jordan vs Damien Winner : Jordan Top Looks: Matt Jordan Bottom Looks: Mel Damien Winner: Jordan
158	8	"Immortals Interrupted"	July 24, 2018	N/A	TBA
Spotlight Challenge: Competing for three finale spots, the artists create vampires based on real life bats. The game changes from battles to one-on-one melee.; Note : As a winner of the previous challenge, Jordan was helped by Todd Masters. Winner: Jordan: Horseshoe bat Safe: Matt: Mouse-eared bat Walter: False Vampire bat Eliminated: Derek: Slit-Faced bat Damien: Bamboo bat Mel: Painted bat Note: Following the judges' initial inspection, the artists are then given an additional hour of last looks to add sunlight damage to their vampires, as one final test before choosing the finalists.
159	9	"Through the Looking Glass, Part 1"	July 31, 2018	N/A	TBA
Spotlight Challenge: The finalists have to create characters for an original short film, directed by the film director John Wynn, based on "lost chapters" of the book Through the Looking-Glass and what Alice found there.; Jordan (assisted by Mel & Kevon) Chapter: Garden Games Characters: The Spring Fox and the Dapper Grasshopper Matt (assisted by Graham & Damien) Chapter: Questionable Queen Characters: The Porcelain Prince and the Tin Jester Walter (assisted by Yvonne & Derek) Chapter: Tea Time Characters: The Ginger General and the Lollipop Ballerina
160	10	"Through the Looking Glass, Part 2"	August 7, 2018	N/A	TBA
Spotlight Challenge: In the series finale, the finalists must revise their makeups from the first part of the finale, as well as create a third character to represent Alice transforming as she travels through each of their environments.; Jordan (assisted by Mel, Kevon & Jo) Chapter: Garden Games Characters: The Spring Fox, the Dapper Grasshopper and Alice's Rabbit Form Matt (assisted by Damien, Graham & Sasha) Chapter: Questionable Queen Characters: The Porcelain Prince, the Tin Jester, and Alice's Toy Form Walter (assisted by Derek, Yvonne & Kelly) Chapter: Tea Time Characters:The Ginger General, the Lollipop Ballerina and Alice's Dessert Form Winner: Matt Guest Judge: Rick Baker
