= Face Off season 11 =

Face Off
- Season 11

Release
- Original network: Syfy
- Original release: January 24 – April 25, 2017

Season chronology
- ← Previous; Season 10 Next → Season 12

The eleventh season of the Syfy reality television series Face Off (Styled as Face Off All Stars) premiered on January 24, 2017. This season features returning contestants ("All-Stars") from previous seasons.

Unlike previous seasons, the contestants will not compete individually, but instead, will be paired in teams of two. Each team will compete to win immunity during one week, while eliminations will take place the following week. From episode 9 forward, the competition is individual and one contestant is eliminated each week. Cig Neutron was declared the winner on the season's finale.

Prizes for this season include a Hyundai Veloster and $100,000.

== Contestants ==
Name	Age	Hometown	Teammate	Original season	Place finished originally	Place finished
Jasmine Ringo	32	Las Vegas, Nevada	Stella	Season 9	9th	16th-15th
Stella Sensel	37	Brooklyn, New York City, New York	Jasmine	Season 7	5th	16th-15th
Cat Paschen	29	Los Angeles, California	Niko	Season 6	9th	14th-13th
Niko Gonzales	29	Los Angeles, California	Cat	Season 6	4th	14th-13th
Gage Hubbard	32	Los Angeles, California	Rachael	Season 1	Runner Up	12th-11th
Rachael Wagner	27	Los Angeles, California	Gage	Season 7	7th	12th-11th
Keaghlan Ashley	27	Los Angeles, California	Melissa	Season 7	9th	10th-9th
Melissa Ebbe	37	Milwaukee, Wisconsin	Keaghlan	Season 10	Runner Up	10th-9th
Adam Milicevic	31	Los Angeles, California	Logan	Season 8	5th	8th
Ben Ploughman	35	Los Angeles, California	Evan	Season 9	Runner Up	7th
Evan Hedges	30	Boulder, Colorado	Ben	Season 9	Runner Up	6th
Logan Long	30	Salt Lake City, Utah	Adam	Season 8	Runner Up	5th
Tyler Green	29	Litchfield, Connecticut	Emily	Season 6	Runner Up	4th
George Troester III	30	Los Angeles, California	Cig	Season 7	4th	Runner Up
Emily Serpico	20	Orlando, Florida	Tyler	Season 8	Runner Up	Runner Up
Cig Neutron	28	Los Angeles, California	George	Season 7	Runner Up	Winner

== Contestant progress ==
- From Week 1-8 the contestants were eliminated as teams. Starting on Week 9, contestants were eliminated individually from their original teams.

Contestant	Episode													
Contestant	1	2	3	4	5	6	7	8	9	10	11	12	13	14
Contestant	Teams								Superteams		Individual			
Cig	IN	IN	WIN	IN‡	IN	WIN	HIGH	WIN	WIN	LOW	IN	WIN	IN	WINNER
Emily	IN	HIGH	HIGH	WIN	WIN	IN‡	WIN	IN‡	LOW	WIN	HIGH	LOW	WIN	RUNNER-UP
George	IN	IN	WIN	IN‡	IN	WIN	HIGH	WIN	WIN	LOW	LOW	HIGH	IN	RUNNER-UP
Tyler	IN	HIGH	HIGH	WIN	WIN	IN‡	WIN	IN‡	LOW	WIN	WIN	IN	OUT	
Logan	IN	LOW	IN	HIGH	HIGH	LOW	LOW	IN	LOW	WIN	IN	OUT		
Evan	LOW	HIGH	HIGH	IN	LOW	IN	LOW	IN	WIN	LOW	OUT			
Ben	LOW	HIGH	HIGH	IN	LOW	IN	LOW	IN	WIN	OUT				
Adam	IN	LOW	IN	HIGH	HIGH	LOW	LOW	IN	OUT					
Melissa	WIN	IN‡	IN	LOW	LOW	LOW	HIGH	OUT						
Keaghlan	WIN	IN‡	IN	LOW	LOW	LOW	HIGH	OUT						
Rachael	HIGH	IN	IN	IN	IN	OUT								
Gage	HIGH	IN	IN	IN	IN	OUT								
Cat	IN	WIN	IN	OUT										
Niko	IN	WIN	IN	OUT										
Stella	LOW	OUT												
Jasmine	LOW	OUT												

Progress Color Key

The contestant won Face Off.
The contestant was a runner-up.
The contestant won a Spotlight or Focus Challenge or The Gauntlet therefore winning immunity.
The contestant was in the top in the Spotlight or Focus Challenge.
The contestant was declared one of the best in the Spotlight or Focus Challenge but was not in the running for the win.
The contestant was in the bottom in the Spotlight or Focus Challenge or in The Gauntlet.
The contestant was a teammate of the eliminated contestant in the Spotlight Challenge.
The contestant was eliminated.
‡ The team won an immunity challenge prior to the elimination challenge.

== Recurring people ==
- McKenzie Westmore - Host
- Michael Westmore - Mentor

=== Judges ===
- Ve Neill
- Glenn Hetrick
- Neville Page

== Episodes ==
No. overall	No. in season	Title	Original release date	U.S. viewers (millions)	18-49 Rating
127	1	"Abstract Aliens"	January 24, 2017	0.73	0.3
Spotlight Challenge: Season 11 begins with the All-Stars coming back in teams of 2 to create deep sea aliens with the use of green screen effects.; Due to the new layout of the show, no one was eliminated this week and the winners receive immunity going into next week's challenge. Top Looks: Gage & Rachael: Skeleton Shrimp Keaghlan & Melissa: Flying Gurnard Safe: Adam & Logan: Veined Octopus Cat & Niko: Vampire Squid Cig & George: Roughback Batfish Emily & Tyler: Deep Sea Dragon Fish Bottom Looks: Ben & Evan: Japanese Spider Crab Jasmine & Stella: Helmet Jellyfish Winner: Keaghlan & Melissa
128	2	"The Devil is in the Details"	January 31, 2017	0.67	0.3
Spotlight Challenge: In this elimination challenge, the teams must create a devil and an angel character, using their own positive and negative traits as inspiration, but have to merge them into one model.; Top Looks: Ben & Evan Cat & Niko Safe: Emily & Tyler Cig & George Gage & Rachael Keaghlan & Melissa Bottom Looks: Adam & Logan Jasmine & Stella Winners: Cat & Niko Eliminated: Jasmine & Stella
129	3	"Monster High"	February 7, 2017	0.77	0.3
Spotlight Challenge: In this immunity challenge, the artists must create real life versions of Monster High dolls, suitable for film.; Unlike other challenges, the judges were not present in this episode. Instead, a focus group made up of Monster High fans judge the artists' make-ups. Guest: Natasha Berling: Vice President of Design & Rebecca Shipman and Natalie Villegas: Project Designers Top Looks: Ben & Evan: Skelita Calaveras Cig & George: Lagoona Blue Emily & Tyler: Draculaura Safe: Adam & Logan: Abbey Bominable Cat & Niko: Clawdeen Wolf Gage & Rachael: Venus McFlytrap Keaghlan & Melissa: Cleo de Nile Winners: Cig & George
130	4	"Snow Queens"	February 14, 2017	0.74	0.3
Spotlight Challenge: In this elimination challenge, the teams have two days as to create "Snow Queens" inspired by unique snowflakes.; Top Looks: Emily & Tyler Adam & Logan Safe: Ben & Evan Cig & George Gage & Rachael Bottom Looks: Cat & Niko Keaghlan & Melissa Winner: Emily & Tyler Eliminated: Cat & Niko
131	5	"Troubling Transformations"	February 21, 2017	0.73	0.3
Spotlight Challenge: In this immunity challenge, the teams have to create two makeups themed after Jekyll and Hyde, one of a mad scientist mid-transformation, and one in full-fledged monster state.; Top Looks: Emily & Tyler: Electrical Shock Adam & Logan: Radiation Exposure Safe: Cig & George: Medical Augmentation Gage & Rachael: Horticultural Hybridization Bottom Looks: Ben & Evan: Chemical Exposure Keaghlan & Melissa: Insect DNA Splicing Winners: Emily & Tyler Guest Judge: John Landis
132	6	"Wasteland Warriors"	February 28, 2017	0.81	0.3
Spotlight Challenge: In this elimination challenge, the teams must create dystopian characters inspired by post-apocalyptic vehicles. They'll use at least three of the assorted car parts in their vehicles' spare parts kits to incorporate in their Warrior makeup.; Top Looks: Cig & George Safe: Emily & Tyler Ben & Evan Bottom Looks: Gage & Rachael Keaghlan & Melissa Adam & Logan Winner: Cig & George Eliminated: Gage & Rachael NOTE: Before any team was eliminated, the bottom looks of the night were given one additional hour of last looks to improve their makeups based on the critiques given to them by the judges. The eliminated team was revealed in the following episode. Guest Judge: Paul W. S. Anderson
133	7	"Puppet Masters"	March 7, 2017	0.70	0.3
Spotlight Challenge: In this immunity challenge, the teams have to create magical marionette characters inspired by "The Adventure of Pinocchio"; Top Looks: Cig & George - Tanner Emily & Tyler - Tailor Keaghlan & Melissa - Blacksmith Bottom Looks: Ben & Evan - Goldsmith Adam & Logan - Stonemason Winner: Emily & Tyler Guest Judge: Suzanne Todd
134	8	"Odd Couples"	March 14, 2017	0.81	0.3
Spotlight Challenge: The five remaining All-Star teams create comedic fantasy duos in the elimination challenge. Each team chooses two models, already outfitted in body suits that give them proportions.; Top Looks: Cig & George - Dwarf & Ogre Safe: Ben & Evan - Wood Elf & Minotaur Emily & Tyler - Goblin & Faun Adam & Logan - Naiad & Orc Bottom Looks: Keaghlan & Melissa - Troll & Fairy Winner: Cig & George Eliminated: Keaghlan & Melissa
135	9	"Frightening Families"	March 21, 2017	0.96	0.3
Spotlight Challenge: The four remaining All-Star teams pair up with another team to form a "Super Team" in order to create deranged, mutant families of three. From this point on, there will be no immunity and contestants will be eliminated individually.; Top Looks: Ben, Evan, Cig & George - Dilapidated circus Bottom Looks: Adam, Logan, Emily & Tyler - Military base Winners: Ben, Evan, Cig & George Eliminated: Adam Guest Judge: Marcus Nispel
136	10	"Cursed Covens"	March 28, 2017	0.92	0.4
Spotlight Challenge: The two "Super Teams" will create cursed witch and warlock characters. Each coven was affected by a curse from the other, and the ingredients of said curse impacted the look.; Top Looks: Emily, Logan & Tyler - Horn of goat, Sage, a dying man's last breath and the sap of a poisoned willow. Bottom Looks: Ben, Cig, Evan & George- Deadly Nightshade, the forked tongue of a black snake, Dried Nettles and a rat's tail. Winners: Emily, Logan & Tyler Eliminated: Ben
137	11	"Intergalactic Congress"	April 4, 2017	0.81	0.3
Spotlight Challenge: The remaining contestants, now competing individually, create an alien delegate for an intergalactic congress.; Top Looks: Emily Tyler Safe: Cig Logan Bottom Looks: Evan George Winner: Tyler Eliminated: Evan
138	12	"Tiki Twist"	April 11, 2017	0.86	0.3
Spotlight Challenge: The five remain contestants must create a representation of Hawaiian deities.; Top Looks: Cig - Kū (God of war) George - Kanaloa (God of the ocean) Safe: Tyler - Kāne (God of earth and stone) Bottom Looks: Emily - Pele (Goddess of fire and volcanoes) Logan - Lono (God of agriculture) Winner: Cig Eliminated: Logan Guest Judge: Lois Burwell
139	13	"Gargoyle Guardians"	April 18, 2017	0.80	0.3
Spotlight Challenge: The four remaining contestants must create gargoyle guardians inspired by different types of architecture.; Cig - Russian Renaissance Emily - Art Deco George - Deconstructivism Tyler - Victorian Winner: Emily Eliminated: Tyler
140	14	"Battle of the Beasts"	April 25, 2017	0.91	0.3
Spotlight Challenge: The final three contestants must create two animal kung-fu masters for an actual fight scene. Each finalist also received help from eliminated contestants.; Cig (assisted by Evan, Logan and Melissa) - Tiger & Dragon Emily (assisted by Adam, Gage and Tyler) - Crane & Mantis George (assisted by Ben, Keaghlan and Rachael) - Snake & Eagle Winner: Cig
