= Face Off season 9 =

Face Off
- Season 9

Release
- Original network: Syfy
- Original release: July 28 – October 27, 2015

Season chronology
- ← Previous; Season 8 Next → Season 10

The 9th season of the Syfy reality television series Face Off premiered on July 28, 2015. The season's third episode, "Surprise of the Century", is the series' 100th episode. The grand prize for the ninth season is a VIP trip from Kryolan to one of their 85 locations, a 2015 Fiat 500, and $100,000. Nora Hewitt of Barkhamsted, Connecticut was declared the winner on October 27, 2015.

== Contestants ==
Name	Age	Hometown	Place finished
Sidney Cumbie	30	Pace, Florida	16th
Omar Sfreddo	39	Hollywood, Florida	15th
Melissa "Missy Munster" Stell	20	Palmdale, California	14th
Brittany Leslie	25	Long Island, New York	13th
Libby Rose	27	Ojai, California	12th
Jason Henricks	35	Crane, Oregon	11th
Ricky Vitus	22	Schenectady, New York	10th
Jasmine Ringo	30	Las Vegas, Nevada	9th
Kevon Ward	27	Rock Springs, Wyoming	8th
Megan "Meg" Wilbur	24	Ewing, New Jersey	7th
Stevie Calabrese	25	Grayslake, Illinois	6th
Jordan Patton	24	Parkersburg, West Virginia	4th/5th
Scott Fensterer	43	Orlando, Florida	4th/5th
Evan Hedges	28	Boulder, Colorado	Runner-up
Ben Ploughman	33	Austin, Texas	Runner-up
Nora Hewitt	24	Barkhamsted, Connecticut	Winner

== Recurring people ==
- McKenzie Westmore - Host
- Michael Westmore - Mentor

=== Judges ===
- Ve Neill
- Glenn Hetrick
- Neville Page

== Contestant progress ==
Contestant	Episode												
Contestant	1	2	3	4	5	6	7	8	9	10	11	12	13/14
Nora	IN	HIGH	LOW	IN	HIGH	IN	IN	WIN‡	HIGH	HIGH	IN	HIGH	WINNER
Ben	WIN	IN	HIGH	IN	HIGH	WIN	IN	IN	LOW	WIN	LOW	WIN	RUNNER-UP
Evan	HIGH	IN	IN	IN	IN	IN‡	LOW	HIGH‡	WIN	LOW	WIN	IN	RUNNER-UP
Jordan	HIGH	IN	HIGH	IN	WIN	LOW	IN	IN	IN	IN	HIGH	OUT	
Scott	IN	IN	IN	WIN	IN	HIGH	IN	HIGH	IN	IN‡	IN	OUT	
Stevie	LOW	IN	IN	HIGH	IN	HIGH	HIGH	LOW	IN	IN	OUT		
Meg	IN	WIN	LOW	LOW	LOW‡	IN	WIN	LOW	IN	OUT			
Kevon	LOW	HIGH	IN	IN	IN	IN	IN	IN‡	OUT				
Jasmine	IN	IN	WIN	HIGH	HIGH	LOW	IN	OUT					
Ricky	IN	IN	HIGH	IN	LOW	IN	OUT						
Jason	IN	IN	LOW	LOW	LOW	OUT							
Libby	LOW	LOW	IN	IN	OUT								
Brittany	IN	HIGH	IN	OUT									
Missy	IN	LOW	OUT										
Omar	LOW	OUT											
Sidney	HIGH	OUT											

The contestant won Face Off.
The contestant was a runner-up.
The contestant won a Spotlight or Focus Challenge or The Gauntlet.
The contestant was part of a team that won a Spotlight or Focus Challenge.
The contestant was in the top in the Spotlight or Focus Challenge.
The contestant was declared one of the best in the Spotlight or Focus Challenge but was not in the running for the win.
The contestant was in the bottom in the Spotlight or Focus Challenge.
The contestant was a teammate of the eliminated contestant in the Spotlight Challenge.
The contestant was eliminated.
‡ The contestant won a Foundation Challenge or a stage of The Gauntlet.

== Episodes ==
No. overall	No. in season	Title	Original release date	U.S. viewers (millions)	18-49 Rating
99	1	"Intergalactic Zoo"	July 28, 2015	1.18	0.4
Spotlight Challenge: Instead of a Foundation Challenge, the contestants are told they are to work in teams of two and make an alien creature using the texture of an item in the Natural History museum as a muse. Furthermore, each team is to use two models in creating their creatures. At elimination, the judges announce to the bottom looks that the difficult challenge is simply a test of the artists abilities, and therefore no one is eliminated.; Top Looks: Ben & Jordan: Azurite with Malachite Evan & Sidney: Schorl Tourmaline Safe: Brittany & Jason: Turtle Shell Jasmine & Ricky: Alligator Skin Meg & Missy: Herbivore Jaw Nora & Scott: Ram Horn Bottom Looks: Kevon & Omar: Clam Shell Stevie & Libby: Native Silver Winner: Ben Eliminated: N/A
100	2	"Siren Song"	August 4, 2015	0.86	0.3
Spotlight Challenge: Working in teams of two, the artists must create "beautiful but deadly" sirens based on sea creatures.; Top Looks: Kevon & Meg: Textile Cone Snail Nora & Brittany: Flabellina Nudibranch Safe: Jordan & Jasmine: Yellow Boxfish Ricky & Ben: Blue Sea Slug Scott & Stevie: Blue-Ringed Octopus Jason & Evan: Peacock Mantis Shrimp Bottom Looks: Omar & Sidney: Portuguese Man O' War Libby & Missy: Striped Surgeonfish Winner: Meg Eliminated: Omar & Sidney
101	3	"Surprise of the Century"	August 11, 2015	0.94	0.4
Spotlight Challenge: For the series 100th episode, the artists must turn engaged couples into whimsically undead duos that will later be married in a ceremony performed by McKenzie Westmore.; Top Looks: Ricky & Jordan: Couple: Charlotte & Serge (Electrocuted) Ben & Jasmine: Couple: Liza & Tom (Cat lady and "beast" cat) Safe: Scott & Stevie: Couple: Leah & Andrew (Christmas carolers who have been frozen to death) Libby & Brittany: Couple: Kelly & Rudy (Wood and water type creatures) Evan & Kevon: Couple: Jamie & Chris (Light and dark type creatures) Bottom Looks: Jason & Missy: Couple: Matt & Cassandra (Fallen off a bridge) Meg & Nora: Couple: Michael (Vivienne Pinay) & Devin (Artist and her artwork) Winner: Jasmine Eliminated: Missy
102	4	"Frightful Fiction"	August 18, 2015	0.88	0.4
Focus Challenge: For the show's first Focus Challenge (in which the artists focus mainly on one aspect of the makeup) the artists have two days to create a monster inspired by literary mash ups. The focus for this challenge will be on the face makeup.; Guest Judge: Lois Burwell Top Looks: Jasmine: Sherlock Holmes Bloodsucker Stevie: Don Quixote: Monster of La Mancha Scott: Don Quixote: Monster of La Mancha Safe: Evan: Sherlock Holmes Bloodsucker Kevon: King Arthur and his Undead Knights Ricky: The Exorcism of Monte Cristo Nora: Gulliver's Travels in the Underworld Libby: The Exorcism of Monte Cristo Ben: King Arthur and his Undead Knights Jordan: Gulliver's Travels in the Underworld Bottom Looks: Jason: Scarlet Letter: Puritan Poltergeist Brittany: Great Expectations of a Serial Killer Meg: Scarlet Letter: Puritan Poltergeist Winner: Scott Eliminated: Brittany
103	5	"The Gatekeepers"	August 25, 2015	0.95	0.4
Foundation Challenge: The artists compete for immunity in a challenge inspired by the Rorschach inkblot test.; Guest Judge: Eryn Krueger Mekash Top Foundations: Jasmine Meg Winner: Meg: Spotlight Challenge: The artists team up to create a gatekeeper character and the creature they are keeping away drawing inspiration from a unique gateway.; Top Looks: Nora & Jasmine Ben & Jordan Safe: Scott & Kevon Evan & Stevie Bottom Looks: Jason & Ricky Meg & Libby Winner: Jordan Eliminated: Libby
104	6	"Extraterrestrial Enterprise"	September 1, 2015	0.88	0.3
Foundation Challenge: In honor of science fiction television shows from the 1950s and 1960s, the artists must create a "retro alien" using a planetary backdrop as inspiration. The winner receives immunity.; Guest Judge: Michael Westmore Top Foundations: Evan Jordan Winner: Evan: Spotlight Challenge: The artists must add 50 years of development to their "retro aliens" they created from the Foundation Challenge, giving them a more modern look.; Surprise Guest: Jonathan Frakes Guest Judge: Michael Dorn Top Looks: Stevie Scott Ben Safe: Evan Nora Meg Ricky Kevon Bottom Looks: Jasmine Jason Jordan Winner: Ben Eliminated: Jason
105	7	"All That Glitters"	September 8, 2015	0.94	0.4
Focus Challenge: The artists face the challenge of taking a male model and turning him into a female character from a classic Shakespearean play.; Top Looks: Meg: Queen Mab - A fairy from Romeo & Juliet Stevie: Hippolyta from A Midsummer Night's Dream Safe: Kevon: Joan of Arc: Joan la Pucelle from The First Part of King Henry the Sixth Ben: Titania from A Midsummer Night's Dream Scott: Cleopatra from The Tragedy of Antony & Cleopatra Nora: Sycorax from The Tempest Jordan: Lady Macbeth from The Tragedy of Macbeth, The King of Scotland Jasmine: Hermione from The Winter's Tale Bottom Looks: Evan: Hecate from The Tragedy of Macbeth, King of Scotland Ricky: Ophelia from The Tragedy of Hamlet, Prince of Denmark Winner: Meg Eliminated: Ricky
106	8	"The Gauntlet"	September 15, 2015	0.94	0.4
The Gauntlet: The artists face three different stages of challenges in which they will be ranked from best to worst. At the end of the challenges, the artist who ranked in the lowest position will be eliminated.; Stage 1: The artists must create a makeup that shows the effects of an individual who has been exposed to extreme heat or extreme cold. Winner of Stage 1: Nora Stage 2: The artists must create a standout paint job on different types of creatures. Winner of Stage 2: Kevon Stage 3: The artists must create three characters based on specific creatures;Witches & Warlocks, Angels or Goblins. Winner of Stage 3: Evan Winner of The Gauntlet: Nora Eliminated: Jasmine
107	9	"Judgment Day"	September 22, 2015	0.94	0.4
Spotlight Challenge: The artists must create their own versions of the "Four Horsemen of the Apocalypse": Pestilence, Famine, War and Death.; Top Looks: Evan - Death Nora - Famine Safe: Meg - Pestilence Jordan - War Scott - Death Stevie - Famine Bottom Looks: Ben - War Kevon - Pestilence Winner: Evan Eliminated: Kevon
108	10	"Freak Show"	September 29, 2015	0.92	0.4
Foundation Challenge: The artists must create a tribal face and body make-up inspired by a specific weapon. The winner receives immunity.; Guest Judge: Robin Mathews Top Looks: Meg Scott Winner: Scott: Spotlight Challenge: The artists must create a freak show character.; Top Looks: Ben - "The Human Peacock" Safe: Nora - "Lobster Larry" Scott - "Twisted Tom" Stevie - "Icicle Irma" Jordan - "Elephant Lady" Bottom Looks: Meg - "Inside Out Oscar" Evan - "Moon Girl" Winner: Ben Eliminated: Meg
109	11	"Beyond the Expanse"	October 6, 2015	0.88	0.2
Focus Challenge: With inspiration from the show The Expanse, the artists must create a human that has evolved to adapt to an environment that has been affected by a catastrophic event.; Top Looks: Jordan - Ice Age Evan - Severe Drought Safe: Nora - Toxic Pollution Scott - Nuclear Fallout Bottom Looks: Ben - Volcanic Disaster Stevie - Polar Melting Winner: Evan Eliminated: Stevie
110	12	"Death Becomes Them"	October 13, 2015	0.98	0.4
Spotlight Challenge: In a double elimination before the finale, the final five artists must create a macabre family member inspired by shows like The Munsters and The Addams Family.; Looks: Ben - Inappropriate Uncle Nora - Blacksheep Cousin Evan - Bully Older Brother Scott - Stern Father Jordan - Spinster Aunt Winner: Ben Advanced: Nora and Evan Eliminated: Jordan and Scott NOTE: Before the last person moving on to the finale was chosen, Evan, Jordan, and Scott were given the opportunity to redo their makeups based on the critiques given to them by the judges.
111	13	"Movie Magic, Part 1"	October 20, 2015	0.85	0.3
Finale Challenge: With help from Patrick Tatopoulos, the artists must create two characters that would be featured in short films. For the first part of the finale, the artists' makeups are put through a screen test, where Patrick and Michael Westmore give them notes on how to revise them for the final shoot. After the screen tests are complete, Mackenzie announces that the scripts have changed and the artists must, in addition to their revisions, create a third character.; Nora - Assisted by Jasmine and Meg - "The Prey": A film about a hunter who is after "his prey". (The Prey and the Hunter) Ben - Assisted by Jordan and Scott - "Resurrection": A film about an alien priest who brings a creature back to life. (The Priest and the Creature) Evan - Assisted by Kevon and Stevie - "Quarantine Zone": A film about a wanderer being infected by a virus and a captive with the virus at an advanced stage. (The Wanderer and the Captive)
112	14	"Movie Magic, Part 2"	October 27, 2015	1.05	0.4
Finale Challenge: The artists must now create a third character for their short films. The artists also get assistance from one more eliminated contestant.; Nora - Assisted by Jasmine, Meg, and Ricky - Third Character: An ally of "the prey" who sets out to hunt "the hunter". (The Prey, the Hunter, and the Ally)/"The Prey" Ben - Assisted by Jordan, Scott, and Jason - Third Character: A victim the priest will attempt to sacrifice. (The Priest, the Creature, and the Victim)/"Resurrection" Evan - Assisted by Kevon, Stevie, and Libby - Third Character: A creature that has reached the final stage of infection by the virus. (The Wanderer, the Captive, and the Creature)/"Quarantine Zone" Winner: Nora
