= Face Off season 10 =

Face Off
- Season 10

Release
- Original network: Syfy
- Original release: January 13 – April 13, 2016

Season chronology
- ← Previous; Season 9 Next → Season 11

The tenth season of the Syfy reality television series Face Off premiered on January 13, 2016. This season marked the return of the judges' power to save an artist from elimination. The grand prize for the fifth season is a VIP trip from Kryolan to one of their 85 locations, a 2016 Fiat 500, and $100,000. Rob Seal of Lake View Terrace, California was declared the winner of this season on April 13, 2016.

== Contestants ==
Name	Age	Hometown	Place finished
Greg Schrantz	22	Allentown, Pennsylvania	14th
Jennifer Bowden	35	Allegan, Michigan	13th
Anthony "Ant" Canonica Jr.	21	Williamstown, New Jersey	12th
Samuel "Njoroge" Karumba	49	Atlanta, Georgia	11th
Katie Kinney	24	Litchfield, Illinois	10th
Johnny Leftwich	28	Los Angeles, California	9th
Kaleb Lewis	22	Oil City, Pennsylvania	8th
Anna Cali	31	Chicago, Illinois	7th
Robert Lindsay	45	Berlin, Germany	6th
Yvonne Cox	28	Alberta, Canada	5th
Melanie "Mel" Licata	26	Hightstown, New Jersey	4th
Walter Welsh	26	Martinez, California	Runner-up
Melissa Ebbe	36	Milwaukee, Wisconsin	Runner-up
Robert "Rob" Seal	20	Lake View Terrace, California	Winner

== Recurring people ==
- McKenzie Westmore - Host
- Michael Westmore - Mentor

=== Judges ===
- Ve Neill
- Glenn Hetrick
- Neville Page

== Contestant progress ==
Contestant	Episode												
Contestant	1	2	3	4	5	6	7	8	9	10	11	12	13/14
Rob	IN	HIGH	IN	WIN	WIN	HIGH	IN‡	WIN	HIGH	HIGH	HIGH	IN	WINNER
Melissa	WIN	HIGH	IN	MIXED	HIGH‡	IN	IN‡	IN	IN‡	WIN	LOW	WIN	RUNNER-UP
Walter	HIGH	IN	IN	IN	IN	IN	IN‡	IN	WIN	LOW	WIN	IN	RUNNER-UP
Mel	IN	WIN	HIGH	IN	HIGH‡	LOW	IN‡	IN	LOW	SAVE	HIGH	OUT	
Yvonne	LOW	LOW	WIN	IN	LOW	WIN	IN	HIGH	IN	IN	OUT		
Robert	IN	LOW	LOW	HIGH	LOW	IN	IN‡	LOW	OUT				
Anna	HIGH	HIGH	HIGH	IN	LOW	IN	LOW	OUT					
Kaleb	HIGH	IN	HIGH	LOW	HIGH	LOW	OUT						
Johnny	LOW	HIGH	LOW	IN	IN	OUT							
Katie	IN	IN	IN	LOW	OUT								
Njoroge	IN	LOW	LOW	OUT									
Ant	LOW	IN	OUT										
Jennifer	IN	OUT											
Greg	OUT												

The contestant won Face Off.
The contestant was a runner-up.
The contestant won a Spotlight or Focus Challenge or The Gauntlet.
The contestant was part of a team that won a Spotlight or Focus Challenge.
The contestant was in the top in the Spotlight or Focus Challenge.
The contestant was declared one of the best in the Spotlight or Focus Challenge but was not in the running for the win.
The contestant was in both the top and the bottom in the Spotlight or Focus Challenge.
The contestant was in the bottom in the Spotlight or Focus Challenge or in The Gauntlet.
The contestant was a teammate of the eliminated contestant in the Spotlight Challenge.
The contestant was deemed the least successful but was saved by the judges and was not eliminated.
The contestant was eliminated.
‡ The contestant won a Foundation Challenge or a stage of The Gauntlet.

== Episodes ==
No. overall	No. in season	Title	Original release date	U.S. viewers (millions)	18-49 Rating
113	1	"Wanted Dead or Alive"	January 13, 2016	0.98	0.3
Spotlight Challenge: Season 10 begins with the 14 competing artists working in teams of two to create rogue alien bounty hunters.; Top Looks: Anna & Melissa : Tolo Ezulon - Last seen in the outer rim of the Taurian Cluster Kaleb & Walter : Maas Rossi - Known to frequent the planet Nyguriat in the boldaarion Galaxy Safe: Robert & Katie : Honorin Fallador - Thought to be hiding on near Purenen Prime's Third Moon Celedan Jennifer & Mel : Delta Indemna - Last known whereabouts Verssa Minor Rob & Njoroge : Sansar Ceptis - Whereabouts unknown believed to have a hide-out in the Ithi Nebula Bottom Looks: Ant & Johnny : Yorek Jess - Believed to be hiding in the Josephus System Greg & Yvonne : Jinxx Barges - Last seen in lower quadrant of the Aurelian System Winner: Melissa Eliminated: Greg
114	2	"Child's Play"	January 20, 2016	0.97	0.4
Spotlight Challenge: Paul Reubens appears when the artists work in teams to create a whimsical makeup based on an over-sized toy. As the winner of the first spotlight challenge, Melissa was allowed to join a team of her choice to form a group of three.; Guest Judge: Paul Reubens Not Chosen: Jack-in-the-box Cellphone Roller Skates Jacks Top Looks: Anna & Mel : Watch Melissa, Rob, & Johnny : Lollipops Safe: Walter & Ant : Racecar Kaleb & Katie : Key Bottom Looks: Robert & Yvonne : Dice Jennifer & Njoroge : Crayons Winner: Mel Eliminated: Jennifer
115	3	"Lost Languages"	January 27, 2016	1.08	0.4
Spotlight Challenge: The remaining 12 artists team up to create a member of a long-lost race inspired by unique languages created by Game of Thrones conlanger David Peterson.; Guest Judge: David Peterson Top Looks: Anna & Yvonne: Rapid, Commanding Language Kaleb & Mel: Breathy, Hissing Language Safe: Katie & Melissa: Calm Language Rob & Walter: Throaty Language Bottom Looks: Johnny & Robert: Aggressive Language Ant & Njoroge: Hissing, Clicking Tongue Winner: Yvonne Eliminated: Ant
116	4	"Covert Characters"	February 3, 2016	0.98	0.4
Focus Challenge: For their first individual challenge, the artists must create realistic disguise makeups for "secret agents".; Guest Judge: Gale Anne Hurd Top Looks: Robert: Agent Popzlateva Rob: Agent Johnson Safe: Melissa: Agent McDonough Mel: Agent Stiles Walter: Agent Visscher Anna: Agent Scamman Johnny: Agent Morales Yvonne: Agent Fuller Bottom Looks: Njoroge: Agent Ansdell Kaleb: Agent Wright Katie: Agent Phillips Winner: Rob Eliminated: Njoroge
117	5	"Foreign Bodies"	February 10, 2016	0.87	0.3
Foundation Challenge: Working in teams of two, the artists must create slime as inspiration for the spotlight challenge. The winning team receives immunity.; Guest Judge: Lance Henriksen Top Foundations: Johnny & Walter Mel & Melissa Winners: Mel & Melissa: Spotlight Challenge: The artists must create parasitic aliens that burst out of human hosts. The aliens also have to include a slime element.; Top Looks: Rob & Kaleb - Nereis sandersi Mel & Melissa - Enoplida nematode Safe: Walter & Johnny - Tardigrade Bottom Looks: Katie & Robert - Taenia taeniaeformis Anna & Yvonne - Lepidonotopodium piscesae Winner: Rob Eliminated: Katie
118	6	"Death's Doorstep"	February 17, 2016	0.86	0.3
Spotlight Challenge: The artists must create whimsical ghost characters based on unique obituaries.; Top Looks: Rob - Wendy Wand (sawed in half) Yvonne - Jerry Rig (killed by a drill) Safe: Melissa - Suzanne Stitches (died in sewing accident) Anna - Rose Mary (died in kitchen explosion) Robert - Thomas Watts (electrocuted in bathtub) Walter - Seymour Sharp (killed by juggling knives) Bottom Looks: Mel - Sally Slopes (died in skiing accident) Johnny - Sarah N. Geti (trampled in safari) Kaleb - Finn Waters (died scuba diving) Winner: Yvonne Eliminated: Johnny
119	7	"The Gauntlet II"	February 24, 2016	0.94	0.4
The Gauntlet: The artists face three different stages of challenges in which the Top Looks of each stage will be deemed safe and will not participate in the following stages. At the end of The Gauntlet one artist will be eliminated.; Stage 1: The artists must create their own captain characters based on a given historical ship. The captains must have a significant beard. Melissa & Yvonne: The Mandjet - Egyptian Sun God Ra's solar barge which travels through the sky to provide light to the world Walter & Rob: Naglfar - Viking Ship composed of the bones & nails of the dead Kaleb & Robert: Flying Dutchman - Pirate ship manned by soulless dead pirates Mel & Anna: The Nautilus - Jules Verne's fictional steam powered submarine from Twenty Thousand Leagues Under the Seas Top Looks of Stage 1: Walter & Melissa Stage 2: Pandora's Boxes - The artists must create a character with three pre-made prostheses that they must use in a different and creative way. Top Looks of Stage 2: Rob & Robert Stage 3: The artists must create three horror makeups that embody the phrase "see no evil, hear no evil, speak no evil". Top Looks of Stage 3: Mel & Yvonne Bottom Looks of Stage 3: Anna & Kaleb Winner of Stage 3: Mel Eliminated: Kaleb
120	8	"Smoke and Mirrors"	March 2, 2016	0.86	0.3
Spotlight Challenge: The artists must transform beautiful, yet evil sorceresses into their hideous true self.; Top Looks: Yvonne - Corpse Conjurer Rob - Dragon Queen Safe: Mel - Temptress of the Flame Melissa - Wiccan of the Woods Walter - Emerald Empress Bottom Looks: Robert - Sea Witch: Maris Tenebris (latin: Darkness of the Sea) Anna - Shadow Enchantress Winner: Rob Eliminated: Anna
121	9	"Bottled Up"	March 9, 2016	0.95	0.3
Foundation Challenge: The artists must create warrior valkyrie makeups. The winner receives immunity.; Guest Judge: Douglas Noe Top Looks: Yvonne Melissa Winner: Melissa: Spotlight Challenge: The artists must create mischievous genie characters based on unique vessels with oil lamps.; Guest Judge: Bill Corso Top Looks: Rob Walter Safe: Yvonne Melissa Bottom Looks: Mel Robert Winner: Walter Eliminated: Robert
122	10	"Keep One Eye Open"	March 16, 2016	0.91	0.3
Focus Challenge: The artists must create unique cyclops characters.; Guest Judge: Douglas Smith Top Looks: Rob Melissa Safe: Yvonne Bottom Looks: Mel Walter Winner: Melissa Eliminated: N/A Saved: Mel
123	11	"The Art of Warcraft"	March 23, 2016	0.89	0.3
Spotlight Challenge: The artists must convert races from World of Warcraft into realistic characters that could be featured in a film.; Guest Consultant: World of Warcraft's Senior Art Director: Chris Robinson Guest Judge: Robert Kazinsky Top Looks: Walter - Draenei Mel - Troll Rob - Tauren Bottom Looks: Yvonne - Goblin Melissa - Worgen Winner: Walter Eliminated: Yvonne
124	12	"Skull Island: Reign of Kong"	March 30, 2016	0.96	0.3
Spotlight Challenge: The artists must select a creature featured in the upcoming "Skull Island: Reign of Kong" attraction at Universal Studios and create an evolved, more intelligent form of it in order to obtain a spot in the finale. The winner of the challenge will get to travel to Universal Studios and be one of the first to experience the "Reign of Kong" attraction.; Looks: Walter - Winged Bat/Rat Hybrid Creature (terapusmordax) Mel - Insect Creature (decarnocimex) Rob - Dinosaur Creature: V-Rex (vastsatatosaur rex) Melissa - Crab-like Creature: aracho-claw (arachnocids) Winner: Melissa Eliminated: Mel
125	13	"Sinister Showdown: Part 1"	April 6, 2016	0.82	0.3
Spotlight Challenge: The artists must create two characters that would be part of a horror film: one demonic character and one possessed character. Three different directors with different scripts of the film named "Hell Hole" will work with each artist. Eliminated contestants will also aid the finalists during the challenge. On the first part of the challenge, the artists create their characters to later get feedback from their directors on what to improve on during a lighting test.; Directors: John Wynn, Bryce James McGuire, & Ryan Spindell Guest Mentor: Lois Burwell Rob with Kaleb and Anna Director: Bryce McGuire for "Hell Hole: Dead Earth" Creatures: Oil/Earth Demon and Possessed Martha Melissa with Yvonne and Johnny Director John Wynn for "Hell Hole: Repossession" Cyclops/Shadow Demon and Possessed Sam Walter with Mel and Robert Director: Ryan Spindell for "Hell Hole: Dark Harvest" Pumpkin/Tree Demon and Possessed Martha
126	14	"Sinister Showdown: Part 2"	April 13, 2016	1.02	0.4
After revising their makeups with their directors, the artists improve their characters in order to get them ready for filming.: Melissa's short film: "Hell Hole: Repossession" with Director John Wynn/Starring Sam, Martha, Cyclops/Shadow Demon, and Possessed Sam; Walter's short film: "Hell Hole: Dark Harvest" with Director Ryan Spindell/Starring Sam, Martha, Pumpkin/Tree Demon, and Possessed Martha; Rob's short film: "Hell Hole: Dead Earth" with Director Bryce James McGuire/Starring Sam, Martha, Oil/Earth Demon, and Possessed Martha; Guest Judge: Jason Blum Winner: Rob
