= Face Off season 12 =

Face Off
- Season 12
- No. of episodes: 10

Release
- Original network: Syfy
- Original release: June 13 – August 22, 2017

Season chronology
- ← Previous; Season 11 Next → Season 13

The twelfth season of the Syfy reality television series Face Off (Styled as Face Off: Divide & Conquer) premiered on June 13, 2017. This season divides contestants into two competing FX shops. Each week the teams designate one competitor the foreperson, who designates group tasks, coordinates the project, and represents the team to the judges. At the end of each challenge, the most successful artist from the winning team is declared the challenge winner, and the least successful artist from the losing team is eliminated.

== Contestants ==
| Name | Age | Hometown | Original Team Shop Name | Place Finished |
|---|---|---|---|---|
| Laura McCormick | 32 | Marlow, Oklahoma | Twisted Six Effects Shop | 12th |
| Al Tuskes | 56 | Cleveland, Ohio | Twisted Six Effects Shop | 11th |
| Nick Fischer | 26 | Wildwood, Illinois | Twisted Six Effects Shop | 10th |
| Jill Burgner | 41 | Cleveland, Ohio | Twisted Six Effects Shop | 9th |
| Joseph Drobezko | 31 | New York City, New York | Ethereal Effects Shop | 8th |
| Suzanne Bostwick | 38 | Stevens Point, Wisconsin | Ethereal Effects Shop | 7th |
| Phil Harrah | 25 | Galloway Township, New Jersey | Twisted Six Effects Shop | 6th |
| Nelson Cooper | 36 | Ventura, California | Ethereal Effects Shop | 4th/5th |
| Faina Rudshteyn | 26 | Brooklyn, New York City, New York | Ethereal Effects Shop | 4th/5th |
| Kierstin Lapatka | 26 | Baltimore, Maryland | Ethereal Effects Shop | Runner Up |
| KC Mussman | 30 | Los Angeles, California | Twisted Six Effects Shop | Runner Up |
| Andrew Freeman | 35 | Glendora, California | Ethereal Effects Shop | Winner |

== Contestant progress ==
| Contestant | Episode | | | | | | | | |
| Contestant | 1 | 2 | 3 | 4 | 5 | 6 | 7 | 8 | 9/10 |
| Contestant | Original Teams | | First Switch | | Second Switch | | | Individual | |
|---|---|---|---|---|---|---|---|---|---|
| Andrew | IN‡ | IN | WIN | HIGH | HIGH | WIN | HIGH‡ | IN | WINNER |
| KC | IN | IN | HIGH | IN | WIN‡ | IN | WIN | IN | RUNNER-UP |
| Kierstin | LOW | HIGH | IN | WIN | LOW‡ | LOW | HIGH‡ | WIN | RUNNER-UP |
| Faina | HIGH | WIN | HIGH | IN‡ | IN | HIGH | LOW | OUT | |
| Nelson | IN | LOW‡ | LOW | IN | IN | LOW‡ | LOW | OUT | |
| Phil | HIGH | LOW | IN | LOW | IN | HIGH‡ | OUT | | |
| Suzanne | LOW | IN | LOW‡ | IN | IN | OUT | | | |
| Joseph | WIN | IN | HIGH | LOW‡ | OUT | | | | |
| Jill | HIGH | LOW‡ | LOW | OUT | | | | | |
| Nick | LOW | HIGH | OUT‡ | | | | | | |
| Al | LOW‡ | OUT | | | | | | | |
| Laura | OUT | | | | | | | | |

The contestant was a member of Twisted Six Effects Shop.
The contestant was a member of Ethereal Effects Shop.
The contestant competed individually.

The contestant won Face Off.
The contestant was a runner-up.
The contestant won a Spotlight Challenge.
The contestant was part of a team that won a Spotlight Challenge.
The contestant was in the top in the Spotlight Challenge.
The contestant was declared one of the best in the Spotlight Challenge but was not in the running for the win.
The contestant was in the bottom in the Spotlight Challenge.
The contestant was a teammate of the eliminated contestant in the Spotlight Challenge.
The contestant was eliminated.
‡ The contestant was the Foreperson for their shop this challenge.

== Recurring people ==
- McKenzie Westmore - Host
- Michael Westmore - Mentor

=== Judges ===
- Ve Neill
- Glenn Hetrick
- Neville Page

== Episodes ==
| No. overall | No. in season | Title | Original release date | Viewers (millions) | Rating (18-49) |
|---|---|---|---|---|---|
| 141 | 1 | "Pack Leaders" | June 13, 2017 | 0.72 | 0.2 |
Spotlight Challenge: In the season 12 premiere, 12 new artists are split into two teams to create werewolf packs, including an Alpha, Beta and Omega.; Top Looks: Faina & Joseph: Omega Jill & Phil: Beta Safe: Andrew (Foreman) & Nelson: Alpha KC: Alpha Bottom Looks: Kierstin & Suzanne: Beta Al (Foreman): Alpha Laura & Nick: Omega Winning Shop: Ethereal Effects Shop Winner: Joseph Eliminated: Laura
| 142 | 2 | "Hive Mind" | June 20, 2017 | 0.52 | 0.2 |
Spotlight Challenge: The artists take inspiration from hive based insects to create "Queen", "Drone", and "Worker" aliens. The shops must each also create a hatching alien egg prop to accompany their aliens.; Ethereal Effects: Termite Twisted Six Effects: Wasp Top Looks: Faina & Kierstin: Worker Nick: Queen Safe: Joseph & Andrew : Drone KC: Worker Suzanne: Egg Bottom Looks: Al: Egg & Drone Phil: Drone Nelson (Foreman): Queen Jill (Forewoman): Queen Winning Shop: Ethereal Effects Shop Winner: Faina Eliminated: Al Guest Judge: Eryn Krueger Mekash (in place of Ve Neill)
| 143 | 3 | "Dream House" | June 27, 2017 | 0.63 | 0.2 |
Team Change: Due to Twisted Six having two fewer members than Ethereal Effects, Joseph was transferred to Twisted Six prior to the start of the third challenge.; Spotlight Challenge: The artists take inspiration from unique houses to create families of whimsical fantasy characters.; Top Looks: Faina & Andrew: Papa Woodchuck KC & Joseph: Fairy Godfather Safe: Phil : Chestpieces for the Fairies Kierstin: Mama Woodchuck Bottom Looks: Suzanne (Forewoman) & Nelson: Tree Witch Nick (Foreman): Elder Fairy Sister Jill: Younger Fairy Sister Winning Shop: Ethereal Effects Shop Winner: Andrew Eliminated: Nick Guest Judge: Elizabeth Mitchell
| 144 | 4 | "Dante's Demons" | July 11, 2017 | 0.58 | 0.2 |
Spotlight Challenge: The artists create demons from the nine circles of Hell described in Dante's Inferno, drawing inspiration from unique 3D printed horns created by Neville.; Top Looks: Andrew: Heresy Kierstin: Gluttony Safe: Faina (Forewoman): Anger Suzanne: Greed Nelson: Limbo KC: Fraud Bottom Looks: Joseph (Foreman): Lust Phil: Violence Jill: Treachery Winning Shop: Ethereal Effects Shop Winner: Kierstin Eliminated: Jill
| 145 | 5 | "String Theory" | July 18, 2017 | 0.64 | 0.2 |
Team Change: Due to Twisted Six having two fewer members than Ethereal Effects, Andrew was transferred to Twisted Six prior to the start of the fifth challenge.; Spotlight Challenge: The artists create representations of the four seasons that will perform a dance number choreographed by Travis Wall with the Antonio Vivaldi's Four Seasons . After the reveal, the judges announce that, due to strong and weak makeups from both shops, this challenge is a draw. As such, the winning and eliminated artists can come from either shop.; Top Looks: Andrew: Spring KC (Forewoman): Summer Safe: Faina: Autumn Suzanne: Spring Nelson: Winter Phil: Autumn Bottom Looks: Kierstin (Forewoman): Summer Joseph: Winter Winning Shop: Tie Winner: KC Eliminated: Joseph Guest Judge: Travis Wall
| 146 | 6 | "Possessed Possessions" | July 25, 2017 | 0.66 | 0.2 |
Spotlight Challenge: The artists create the owners of possessed objects, with the makeups reflecting an interaction between the victim and the object.; Top Looks: Andrew: Tricycle Phil (Foreman): Baby Carriage Faina: Typewriter Safe: KC: Camera Bottom Looks: Kierstin: Radio Suzanne: Clock Nelson (Foreman): Violin Winning Shop: Twisted Six Effects Winner: Andrew Eliminated: Suzanne Guest Judge: Cheyenne Jackson
| 147 | 7 | "Feral Fungi" | August 1, 2017 | 0.62 | 0.2 |
Spotlight Challenge: The artists create zombies born of a fungal virus at three stages: one, seven, and thirty days after infection. At the end of the challenge, the shops are dissolved, and the judges choose 5 semi-finalists to move forward to compete individually.; Top Looks: Andrew(Foreman): Brain mushroom, Thirty Days Kierstin(Forewoman): Octopus stinkhorn, One Day KC: Brain mushroom, Seven Days Bottom Looks: Nelson: Octopus stinkhorn, Thirty Days Faina: Octopus stinkhorn, Seven Days Phil: Brain mushroom, One Day Winning Shop: None (Shops Dissolved) Winner: KC Eliminated: Phil Guest Judge: Neil Druckmann
| 148 | 8 | "Amusing Aliens" | August 8, 2017 | 0.63 | 0.2 |
Spotlight Challenge: The artists create whimsical aliens inspired by actual recordings captured from space.; Winner: Kierstin Eliminated: Faina & Nelson Guest Judge: Rick Baker
| 149 | 9 | "Journey Into Fear, Part 1" | August 15, 2017 | 0.70 | 0.2 |
Spotlight Challenge: The final three artists create makeups to be featured in a haunted house designed by Glenn Hetrick. Each contestant selects a room in the house, and is assigned two characters to interpret. Each Finalist is assisted by season 3 semi-finalist/season 5 finalist Roy Wooley with fabricated elements for their characters during day 2.; Andrew (assisted by Nelson & Joseph) - The Laboratory (The Doctor and the Experiment) KC (assisted by Faina & Jill) - Hell (Asmodeus and the Imp) Kierstin (assisted by Phil & Suzanne) - The Temple (Ahmet and the Conjurer)
| 150 | 10 | "Journey Into Fear, Part 2" | August 22, 2017 | 0.54 | 0.2 |
Spotlight Challenge: The finalists must revise their makeups from the first part of the finale, as well as create a floater character to interact with the public outside of their rooms.; Andrew (assisted by Nelson, Joseph & Nick) - The Laboratory (The Doctor, the Experiment, and the Laboratory Floater) KC (assisted by Faina, Jill & Laura) - Hell (Asmodeus, the Imp, and the Hell Floater) Kierstin (assisted by Phil, Suzanne & Al) - The Temple (Ahmet, the Conjurer, and the Temple Floater) Winner: Andrew
