= Face Off season 8 =

Face Off
- Season 8
- No. of episodes: 14

Release
- Original network: Syfy
- Original release: January 13 – April 14, 2015

Season chronology
- ← Previous; Season 7 Next → Season 9

The eighth season of the Syfy reality television series Face Off premiered on January 13, 2015. This season was won by Darla Edin of Minneapolis, Minnesota.

The theme this season is "Return of the Champions". Three former winners Season 2 - Rayce Bird, Season 4 - Anthony Kosar, and Season 5 - Laura Dandridge will guide teams of five to victory. In the end, Laura earned her second win on this show in this season.

Prizes for this season include US$100,000, a 2015 Fiat, and a VIP trip to one of Kryolan's makeup locations.

== Recurring people ==
- McKenzie Westmore - Host
- Michael Westmore - Mentor

=== Judges ===
- Ve Neill
- Glenn Hetrick
- Neville Page

=== The Champions / Coaches ===
- Season 2 - Rayce Bird
- Season 4 - Anthony Kosar
- Season 5 - Laura Dandridge

== Contestants ==
Name	Team	Age	Hometown	Place finished
Gregory Hewett	Team Laura	37	Charlotte, North Carolina	15th
Alan Carnes	Team Anthony	31	Redding, California	14th
Daniel Prado	Team Anthony	38	Atlanta, Georgia	13th
Regina Jiganti	Team Rayce	23	Chicago, Illinois	12th
Anthony Reyes	Team Rayce	20	New York City, New York	11th
Rob Miller	Team Rayce	41	Monroe, Michigan	10th
Jamie Leodones	Team Anthony	29	Burbank, Los Angeles, California	9th
Kelly Harris	Team Anthony	23	Columbus, Ohio	8th
Stephanie Masco	Team Laura	21	Plainfield, Illinois	7th
Ben Peter	Team Anthony	32	Centerville, Ohio	6th
Adam Milicevic	Team Rayce	30	Orlando, Florida	5th
Julian Bonfiglio	Team Laura	25	Fremont, California	4th
Logan Long	Team Rayce	28	Salt Lake City, Utah	Runner-up
Emily Serpico	Team Laura	18	Palm Beach, Florida	Runner-up
Darla Edin	Team Laura	28	Minneapolis, Minnesota	Winner

== Contestant progress ==
Contestant	Episode												
Contestant	1/2	3	4	5	6	7	8	9	10	11	12	13	14
Darla	IN‡	HIGH	HIGH	LOW	IN	IN	IN	WIN	IN	HIGH	WIN	IN	WINNER
Emily	IN	HIGH	WIN	IN	LOW	HIGH‡	HIGH	IN	LOW	IN	HIGH	WIN	RUNNER-UP
Logan	WIN	IN	IN	IN	IN	WIN	IN	IN	WIN	IN	IN	IN	RUNNER-UP
Julian	HIGH	LOW	HIGH	HIGH	IN	HIGH	HIGH	HIGH	IN	LOW	LOW	OUT	
Adam	HIGH	LOW	IN	LOW‡	IN	LOW	IN	HIGH	HIGH	WIN	OUT		
Ben	LOW	WIN	IN	HIGH	HIGH	LOW	WIN	LOW	IN	OUT			
Stephanie	HIGH	LOW	IN	WIN	IN	IN	LOW	IN‡	OUT				
Kelly	LOW	IN	IN	HIGH	HIGH	LOW	HIGH	OUT					
Jamie	IN	IN	LOW	IN	WIN	HIGH	OUT						
Rob	HIGH	IN	IN	IN	LOW	OUT							
Anthony	HIGH	IN	LOW	LOW	OUT								
Regina	HIGH	HIGH	IN	OUT									
Daniel	IN	IN	OUT										
Alan	IN	OUT											
Gregory	OUT												

Color key:

Contestant in Team Rayce
Contestant in Team Anthony
Contestant in Team Laura
The contestant won Face Off.
The contestant was a runner-up.
The contestant won a Spotlight Challenge.
The contestant was part of a team that won the Spotlight Challenge.
The contestant was in the top in the Spotlight Challenge.
The contestant was declared one of the best in the Spotlight Challenge but was not in the running for the win.
The contestant was in the bottom in the Spotlight Challenge.
The contestant was a teammate of the eliminated contestant in the Spotlight Challenge.
The contestant was eliminated.
‡ The contestant won the Foundation Challenge

== Episodes ==
No. overall	No. in season	Title	Original release date	U.S. viewers (millions)	18-49 Rating
85	1	"Return of the Champions"	January 13, 2015	1.19	0.5
Foundation Challenge: The contestants create a companion for a creature previously created by the new coaches: Laura, Anthony and Rayce. The coaches select their teams of five to guide them to victory. The winner gains immunity.; Judge : Ve Neill Top Looks: Darla Rob Winner: Darla: Spotlight Challenge: The teams create two alien creatures inspired by a UFO crash scene with Rick Baker guest judging. However, a twist to the challenge is added with the spotlight challenge concluded in the following episode.; Aliens: Team Laura: Adaptive aliens; Team Anthony: Pilot and Miner; Team Rayce: Scientist and Neanderthal
86	2	"Monkey Business"	January 20, 2015	1.04	0.4
Spotlight Challenge: The contestants are told that the UFOs from the previous episode's challenge, have crashed on the "Planet of the Apes" and they now have to create a third creature: a primate ruler.; Guest: Rick Baker Primates: Team Laura: Squirrel Monkey; Team Anthony: Mandrill; Team Rayce: White-faced Capuchin; Top Team Team Rayce Bottom Looks: Kelly Gregory Ben Winner: Logan Eliminated: Gregory
87	3	"Let The Games Begin"	January 27, 2015	1.12	0.4
Spotlight Challenge: The contestants are tasked to create a cinema-inspired predator creature design by combining animals and exotic plants.; Guest: Josh Hutcherson Top Looks: Emily & Regina - Hyena/Shampoo Ginger Ben & Darla - Ram/Cactus Safe: Anthony & Logan - Warthog/American Pitcher Plant Kelly & Daniel - Scorpion/Delphinium Rob & Jamie - Piranha/Blue Thistle Bottom Looks: Julian & Adam - Bat/Sugarbrush Protea Stephanie & Alan - Thorny dragon/Cockscomb Winner: Ben Eliminated: Alan
88	4	"Royal Flush"	February 3, 2015	0.88	0.3
Spotlight Challenge: For their first individual challenge, the contestants are dealt a royal court playing card and use it to design a character worthy of a Tim Burton film.; Guest: Robert Stromberg Top Looks: Darla - Jack of Hearts Emily - Queen of Hearts Julian - Jack of Clubs Safe: Adam - King of Clubs Ben - Jack of Diamonds Kelly - Queen of Spades Logan - Queen of Clubs Regina - Joker Rob - Jack of Spades Stephanie - King of Diamonds Bottom Looks: Anthony - King of Hearts Daniel - Queen of Diamonds Jamie - King of Spades Winner: Emily Eliminated: Daniel
89	5	"Sounding Off"	February 10, 2015	0.99	0.4
Foundation Challenge: In a tag-team relay, the contestants take inspiration from claws in order to create a character. The winner gains immunity.; Guest Judge: Jill Wagner Top Looks: Adam Kelly Rob Winner: Adam: Spotlight Challenge: The contestants must create a character around a unique sound effect composed by sound designer Erik Aadahl.; Top Looks: Stephanie & Kelly - Ticks - Housewife Automaton Julian & Ben - Heavy Breathing and Slash - Demonic Executioner Safe: Emily & Jamie - Jungle Clicks - Tribal Velociraptor Logan & Rob - Grunts and Snarls - Giant Beast Bottom Looks: Adam & Regina - Machine Boot Up - Alien Supersoldier Darla & Anthony - Haunted Breathing and Screams - Soul-Stealing Banshee Winner: Stephanie Eliminated: Regina
90	6	"Troll Bridge"	February 17, 2015	1.08	0.4
Spotlight challenge: The eleven remaining artists must create a troll based on an iconic bridge.; Guest Judge: Doug Jones Top Looks: Kelly - Tower Bridge in London Ben - Python Bridge in Amsterdam Jamie - Dragon Bridge in Bali Safe: Darla - Python Bridge in Amsterdam Adam - Dragon Bridge in Bali Julian - Corvin Castle Bridge in Transylvania Stephanie - Corvin Castle Bridge in Transylvania Logan - Golden Gate Bridge in San Francisco Bottom Looks: Anthony - The Helix Bridge in Singapore Rob - Tower Bridge in London Emily - Golden Gate Bridge in San Francisco Winner: Jamie Eliminated: Anthony
91	7	"Queen Bees"	February 24, 2015	1.01	0.4
Foundation Challenge: The contestants take inspiration from unique hats to create a character. The winner receives immunity.; Guest Judge: Lois Burwell Top Looks: Emily Rob Winner: Emily: Spotlight Challenge: The contestants participate in a nude body painting challenge where they have to create a queen insect and her companion.; Top Looks: Julian & Logan - Cuckoo Wasp Emily & Jamie - Honey Bee Safe: Darla & Stephanie - Jewel Beetle Bottom Looks: Adam & Rob - Ladybug Ben & Kelly - European Hornet Winner: Logan Eliminated: Rob
92	8	"Dressed To Kill"	March 3, 2015	1.15	0.5
Spotlight Challenge: The contestants must create a stylish and intelligent horror villain based on an avant-garde outfit of their choice along with inspiration from the works of writer and director Clive Barker .; Guest Judge: Mark Alan Miller Top Looks: Ben Emily Julian Kelly Safe: Adam Darla Logan Bottom Looks: Jamie Stephanie Winner: Ben Eliminated: Jamie
93	9	"Miss Intergalactic"	March 10, 2015	1.19	0.4
Foundation Challenge: The contestants are taken to a windy beach where they must use holi powder to create a make up representing spring which will be blindly judged by this season's coaches. The winner receives immunity; Winner: Stephanie: Spotlight Challenge: The contestants must take inspiration from different galaxies in the universe to create alien beauty queens who compete in an intergalactic beauty pageant.; Guest Judge: Darren Franich Top Looks: Adam - Miss Cigar Galaxy Julian - Miss Whirlpool Galaxy Darla - Miss Sculptor Galaxy Safe: Logan - Miss Comet Galaxy Emily - Miss Pinwheel Galaxy Stephanie - Miss Tadpole Galaxy Bottom Looks: Ben - Miss Andromeda Galaxy Kelly - Miss Sombrero Galaxy Winner: Darla Eliminated: Kelly
94	10	"Super Selfies"	March 17, 2015	1.01	0.4
Spotlight Challenge: The artists must be their own models while creating superhero/supervillain makeups.; Guest Judge: Todd McFarlane Top Looks: Adam - Crimson Wave Logan - Slayer Safe: Ben - Infected warrior Darla - Guardian angel Julian - Evil hero Bottom Looks: Stephanie - Dollface Emily - Nature's Daughter Winner: Logan Eliminated: Stephanie
95	11	"Imaginary Friends"	March 24, 2015	1.20	0.4
Spotlight Challenge: The artists must turn children's imaginary friends into whimsical characters.; Top Looks: Adam - Lazor Darla - Diamond Princess Safe: Emily - Lulu Logan - Heart Mermaid Bottom Looks: Ben - 3-headed monster Julian - B-boy Zombie Winner: Adam Eliminated: Ben As a result of Ben's elimination, Team Anthony is left with no remaining artists
96	12	"Deadly Dolls"	March 31, 2015	1.26	0.4
Spotlight Challenge: The artists must create serial killer doll characters in the style of Child's Play's Chucky and Annabelle.; Guest Judge: Don Mancini Top Looks: Darla - Porcelain Doll Emily - Rag Doll Safe: Logan - Voodoo Doll Bottom Looks: Adam - Baby Doll Julian - Ventriloquism Dummy Winner: Darla Eliminated: Adam
97	13	"Full Steam Ahead"	April 7, 2015	1.054	0.34
Spotlight Challenge: The artists must create western steampunk cyborgs, in order to make it to the finals.; Logan - Barmaid Darla - Blacksmith Emily - Undertaker Julian - Bank Robber Winner: Emily Eliminated: Julian
98	14	"The Dream Team"	April 14, 2015	1.197	0.42
Spotlight Challenge: With help from the eliminated contestants, the final three artists must each create four characters that could star in a film of these genres: Sci-Fi, Fantasy or Post-Apocalyptic. The characters will then be displayed at Universal Studios with audience members voting for their favorites.; Darla - Assisted by Rob, Anthony, Stephanie, and Daniel - Fantasy (The Spirits of Eden) Emily - Assisted by Adam, Jamie, Regina, and Kelly - Post-Apocalyptic (Paradise Reckoning) Logan - Assisted by Julian, Ben, Gregory, and Alan - Sci-Fi (The Fortress) Winner: Darla
