= Face Off season 6 =

Face Off
- Season 6
- No. of episodes: 15

Release
- Original network: Syfy
- Original release: January 14 – April 22, 2014

Season chronology
- ← Previous; Season 5 Next → Season 7

The sixth season of the Syfy reality television series Face Off premiered on January 14, 2014. The season features 15 prosthetic-makeup artists competing against each other to create makeup effects. In this season, the judges have the power to save one contestant who would normally be eliminated. The grand prize for the sixth season is a VIP trip from Kryolan to one of their 85 locations, a 2014 Fiat 500, and $100,000. Rashaad Santiago of The Bronx, New York City, New York won this season.

== Judges ==
- Ve Neill
- Glenn Hetrick
- Neville Page
- McKenzie Westmore (Host)
- Michael Westmore (mentor)

== Contestants ==
Name	Age	Hometown	Place finished
Margaret Caragan	32	Oakland, California	15th
Bethany Serpico	22	Astoria, New York	14th
Daniel Phillips	44	St. Clair Shores, Michigan	13th
Tess Laeh	25	Parker, Colorado	12th
Tanner White	26	San Diego, California	11th
Matt Silva	24	Atlanta, Georgia	10th
Cat Paschen	26	San Francisco, California	9th
Corinne Foster	27	Los Angeles, California	8th
Chloe Sens	22	Austin, Texas	7th
Graham Schofield	29	Los Angeles, California	6th
Daran Holt	41	Los Angeles, California	5th
Niko Gonzalez	26	San Germán, Puerto Rico	4th
Tyler Green	26	Litchfield, Connecticut	Runner-up
George Schminky	37	San Francisco, California	Runner-up
Rashaad Santiago	25	The Bronx, New York City, New York	Winner

== Contestant progress ==
Contestant	Episode														
Contestant	1	2	3	4	5	6	7	8	9	10	11	12	13	14	15
Rashaad	HIGH	IN	HIGH	HIGH	IN	HIGH	IN	IN	LOW	IN	IN	WIN	WIN	IN	WINNER
Tyler	LOW	IN	WIN	HIGH	IN	WIN	HIGH	IN	IN	WIN	WIN	HIGH	LOW	IN	RUNNER-UP
George	HIGH‡	LOW	HIGH	HIGH	IN	IN	WIN	LOW	IN	IN	IN	HIGH	HIGH	WIN	RUNNER-UP
Niko	IN	HIGH	LOW	IN	WIN	IN	LOW	IN	IN	LOW	HIGH	IN	LOW	OUT	
Daran	HIGH	HIGH	IN	WIN‡	LOW	LOW	IN	WIN‡	WIN	IN	LOW	OUT			
Graham	HIGH	IN	IN	IN	HIGH	HIGH	IN	SAVE	IN	HIGH	OUT				
Chloe	WIN	IN	IN	LOW	IN	HIGH	LOW	IN	HIGH	OUT					
Corinne	IN	WIN	IN	IN	HIGH	LOW‡	HIGH	HIGH	OUT						
Cat	IN	LOW	IN	IN	LOW	LOW	OUT								
Matt	LOW	LOW	IN	LOW	IN	OUT									
Tanner	IN	HIGH	IN	LOW	OUT										
Tess	IN	IN	LOW	OUT											
Daniel	IN	IN	OUT												
Bethany	LOW	OUT													
Margaret	OUT														

The contestant won Face Off.
The contestant was a runner-up.
The contestant won a Spotlight Challenge.
The contestant was part of a team that won the Spotlight Challenge.
The contestant was in the top in the Spotlight Challenge.
The contestant was in the bottom in the Spotlight Challenge.
The contestant was a teammate of the eliminated contestant in the Spotlight Challenge.
The contestant was eliminated.
The contestant was deemed the least successful but was saved by the judges and was not eliminated.
‡ The contestant won the Foundation Challenge.

== Episodes ==
No. overall	No. in season	Title	Original release date	U.S. viewers (millions)	18-49 Rating
55	1	"Sexy Beasts"	January 14, 2014	1.39	0.6
Foundation Challenge: The contestants must use a wig as inspiration for a character that represents themselves as artists.; Guest Judge: Tami Lane Top Foundations: Bethany and George Reward: Immunity and choice of Spotlight challenge team to work with. Winner: George: Spotlight Challenge: Using an image of a castle as inspiration, the contestants work in teams to create beast characters that will pose alongside beauty models.; Guest Judge: Stephen Sommers Top Looks: Daran, George & Graham - Stone Fortress Chloe & Rashaad - Undersea City Safe: Cat & Daniel - European Palace Corinne & Tanner - Ice Fortress Niko & Tess - Arabic Temple Bottom Looks: Margaret & Matt - Alien Landscape Bethany & Tyler - Hindu Temple Winner: Chloe Eliminated: Margaret
56	2	"Cosmic Conspiracy"	January 21, 2014	1.52	0.7
Spotlight Challenge: The artists must create out-of-this-world alien creatures that must reflect a decoded interplanetary distress signal.; Guest Judge: Scott Charles Stewart Top Looks: Corinne & Niko - "We Need Water" Daran & Tanner - "Ice Caps Melting" Safe: Chloe & Graham - "Gravity Changing" Daniel & Tess - "Overcome With Disease" Rashaad & Tyler - "Global Famine" Bottom Looks: Bethany & George - "Polluted and Toxic Environment" Cat & Matt - "Our Sun Is Dying" Winner: Corinne Eliminated: Bethany
57	3	"Dragon's Breath"	January 28, 2014	1.42	0.7
Spotlight Challenge: In the artists' first individual challenge, they must create a human-dragon creature while using one of several damaged shields as inspiration.; Top Looks: George - Charred Rashaad - Tarred Tyler - Frozen Safe Cat - Frozen Corinne - Corroded Chloe - Sandblasted Daran - Corroded Graham - Slimed Matt - Tarred Tanner - Charred Bottom Looks: Daniel - Slimed Niko - Quilled Tess - Quilled Winner: Tyler Eliminated: Daniel
58	4	"Guitar Gods"	February 4, 2014	1.39	0.7
Foundation Challenge: The artists must create an original character that ties in with the motorcycle of their choice.; Guest Judge: Patrick Tatopoulos Top Foundations: Daran and Tanner Reward: Immunity Winner: Daran: Spotlight Challenge: The artists must create an original rockstar character that has become one with the guitar of their choice.; Top Looks: Daran & George Rashaad & Tyler Safe Cat & Niko Corinne & Graham Bottom Looks: Chloe & Tanner Matt & Tess Winner: Daran Eliminated: Tess
59	5	"In the Shadows"	February 11, 2014	1.35	0.6
Spotlight Challenge: The artists must create a supernatural entity based on mysterious silhouettes.; Guest Judge: Oren Peli Top Looks: Corinne (Goblin) Graham (Insect Creature) Niko (Minotaur) Safe: Chloe (Skeletal Goat Creature) George (Red Demon Creature) Matt (Executioner) Rashaad (Purple Demon) Tyler (Scorpion Creature) Bottom Looks: Cat (Insect Monster) Daran (Monster with Mouth on Back) Tanner (Big Horned Demon) Winner: Niko Eliminated: Tanner
60	6	"Cryptic Creatures"	February 18, 2014	1.86	0.9
Foundation Challenge: The artists, in teams of two, must create an orc lord and nine of his clan.; Guest Judge: Howard Berger Top Looks: Chloe and George; Corinne and Matt Reward: Immunity Winner: Corinne: Spotlight Challenge: The artists must take inspiration from legends to bring cryptids to life.; Guest Judge: Doug Jones Top Looks: Chloe & Tyler - Mapinguari Graham & Rashaad - Bunyip Safe: George & Niko - Vodyanoy Bottom Looks: Cat & Daran - Chupacabra Corinne & Matt - Jersey Devil Winner: Tyler Eliminated: Matt
61	7	"Open Sesame"	February 25, 2014	1.12	0.5
Spotlight Challenge: The artists must create an original wizard inspired by their choice of wands.; Top Looks: Corinne George Tyler Safe Daran Graham Rashaad Bottom Looks: Cat Chloe Niko Winner: George Eliminated: Cat Note: After the spotlight challenge, McKenzie Westmore announced to the artists that she will be taking them on a field trip to Japan.
62	8	"Ego Trip Abroad"	March 4, 2014	1.21	0.6
Foundation Challenge: The artists must create an original take on a Japanese Oni.; Guest Judge: Kazuhiro Tsuji Top Looks: Daran and Corinne Reward: Immunity Winner: Daran: Spotlight Challenge: The artists must create a hyper-stylized anime character that is an alter-ego of themselves.; Guest Judge: Kazuhiro Tsuji Top Looks: Corinne Daran Safe: Chloe Niko Rashaad Tyler Bottom Looks: George Graham Winner: Daran Eliminated: No one Saved: Graham
63	9	"Mad Science"	March 11, 2014	1.25	0.5
Spotlight Challenge: The artists must create the victim that falls to their mad schemes.; Top Looks: Chloe - Antique Amputation Saw Daran - Pneumatic Bone Auger Safe: George - Ribcage Opener Graham - Electroshock Machine Niko - Antique Hand Drill Tyler - Embalming Pump Bottom Looks: Corinne - Leeches Rashaad - Trephine Winner: Daran Eliminated: Corinne
64	10	"What a Dahl"	March 18, 2014	1.27	0.6
Spotlight Challenge: The artists must bring to life creatures mentioned in Willy Wonka & the Chocolate Factory.; Guest Judge: Lucy Dahl Top Looks: Graham - Snozzwanger Tyler - Whangdoodle Safe: Daran - Hornswoggler George - Vermicious Knid Rashaad - Whangdoodle Bottom Looks: Chloe - Vermicious Knid Niko - Hornswoggler Winner: Tyler Eliminated: Chloe
65	11	"Freaks of Nature"	March 25, 2014	1.23	0.5
Spotlight Challenge: The artists must create an original mutant with the DNA trait of their choice.; Guest Judge: Valli O'Reilly Top Looks: Niko - Magnetism Tyler - Wall Crawling Safe: George - Impenetrable Skin Rashaad - Elasticity Bottom Looks: Daran - Panoramic Vision Graham - Tunneling Winner: Tyler Eliminated: Graham
66	12	"Industrial Revolution"	April 1, 2014	1.11	0.6
Spotlight Challenge: The artists must create a robot with multiple functions and has taken over the occupation of their choice. Their robots must show a distinctive advantage over their human counterpart.; Top Looks: George - Hairdresser Rashaad - Firefighter Tyler - Surgeon Safe: Niko - Construction Worker Bottom Look: Daran - Photographer Winner: Rashaad Eliminated: Daran
67	13	"Bloodsuckers"	April 8, 2014	1.33	0.6
Spotlight Challenge: Each artist must create a vampire based on a specific legendary bloodsucker from a foreign culture. Their vampires will also need to be presented with a new ability that will make them unique.; Guest Judge: Len Wiseman Top Looks: George - Yara-ma-yha-who Rashaad - Jiangshi Bottom Looks: Tyler - Sasabonsam Niko - Aswang Winner: Rashaad Note: This episode is the first of a two part spotlight challenge and no one was eliminated. The second part of the task is given in the next episode.
68	14	"Cry Wolf"	April 15, 2014	1.29	0.6
Spotlight Challenge: In the second part of the previous episode's spotlight challenge, the artists must create a werewolf character that is the enemy of the vampires they have created. Their werewolves must visibly show a feature that makes them capable of killing the vampire.; Guest Judge: Patrick Tatopoulos Winner: George Safe: Rashaad Tyler Eliminated: Niko
69	15	"Heavenly Bodies"	April 22, 2014	1.36	0.7
Spotlight Challenge: The final three contestants will have to create two rival alien races with lighting effects that must perform a dance routine at an underground nightclub. George - assisted by Corinne & Niko - used the constellation Cetus Rashaad - assisted by Cat & Daran - used the constellation Ursa Major Tyler - assisted by Chloe & Graham - used the constellation Leo Winner: Rashaad
