= Face Off season 7 =

Face Off
- Season 7

Release
- Original network: Syfy
- Original release: July 22 – October 28, 2014

Season chronology
- ← Previous; Season 6 Next → Season 8

The seventh season of the Syfy reality television series Face Off premiered on July 22, 2014. The season features 16 prosthetic-makeup artists competing against each other to create makeup effects. This season will have a specific theme, 'Life and Death'.

In this season, the contestants faced a Sudden Death challenge, when, during the first episode, it was revealed that the contestants' first challenge is actually their final audition to be on the show.

Prizes for this season include US$100,000, a 2014 Fiat 500, and a VIP trip to one of Kryolan's makeup locations. Dina Cimarusti of Chicago, Illinois won this season in the end.

== Recurring people ==
- McKenzie Westmore - Host
- Michael Westmore - Mentor

=== Judges ===
- Lois Burwell
- Ve Neill appears as a judge in only three episodes due to The Hunger Games commitments.
- Glenn Hetrick
- Neville Page

== Contestants ==
Name	Age	Hometown	Place finished
Scott Mitchell	48	Chicago, Illinois	16th
Gabby Leithsceal	43	Loveland, Ohio	15th
Barry Mahoney	33	Southborough, Massachusetts	14th
Gwen Crew	25	Cincinnati, Ohio	13th
Vince Niebla	42	San Diego, California	12th
David "Doc" O’Connell	25	Orlando, Florida	11th
Jason Hodges	27	Atlanta, Georgia	10th
Keaghlan Ashley	24	Oxnard, California	9th
Damien Zimmerman	24	Junction City, Kansas	8th
Rachael Wagner	24	Chapel Hill, North Carolina	7th
Sasha Glasser	22	Irvine, California	6th
Stella Sensel	34	Brooklyn, New York City, New York	5th
George Troester III	27	Los Angeles, California	4th
Drew Talbot	29	St. Louis, Missouri	Runner-up
Cig Neutron	25	Los Angeles, California	Runner-up
Dina Cimarusti	28	Chicago, Illinois	Winner

== Contestant progress ==
Contestant	Episode													
Contestant	1	2	3	4	5	6	7	8	9	10	11	12	13	14
Dina	WIN	LOW	IN	IN	IN	WIN	LOW	WIN	HIGH	IN	WIN	HIGH	WIN	WINNER
Cig	IN	WIN	IN	LOW	HIGH	LOW	HIGH	HIGH	HIGH	HIGH	HIGH	WIN	IN	RUNNER-UP
Drew	IN	IN	IN	LOW	IN	IN	IN	HIGH	LOW	WIN	IN	LOW	IN	RUNNER-UP
George	IN	HIGH	IN	IN	IN	IN	WIN	IN	IN	LOW	LOW	HIGH	OUT	
Stella	IN	HIGH	WIN	HIGH	LOW	HIGH	IN	IN	IN	IN	IN‡	OUT		
Sasha	HIGH	LOW	HIGH	HIGH	HIGH	LOW	SAVE	LOW	WIN	IN	OUT			
Rachael	IN	HIGH	IN	IN‡	IN	HIGH	HIGH‡	LOW	IN	OUT				
Damien	IN	IN	LOW	LOW	WIN	LOW	IN	IN	OUT					
Keaghlan	HIGH	IN	HIGH	IN	LOW	HIGH	LOW	OUT						
Jason	LOW	LOW	IN	WIN	IN	OUT								
Doc	IN	HIGH	LOW	HIGH	OUT									
Vince	HIGH	HIGH	IN	OUT										
Gwen	LOW	IN	OUT											
Barry	IN	OUT												
Gabby	OUT													
Scott	OUT													

Color key:

The contestant won Face Off.
The contestant was a runner-up.
The contestant won a Spotlight Challenge.
The contestant was part of a team that won the Spotlight Challenge.
The contestant was in the top in the Spotlight Challenge.
The contestant was declared one of the best in the Spotlight Challenge but was not in the running for the win.
The contestant was in the bottom in the Spotlight Challenge.
The contestant was a teammate of the eliminated contestant in the Spotlight Challenge.
The contestant was eliminated.
The contestant was deemed the least successful but was saved by the judges and was not eliminated.
‡ The contestant won the Foundation Challenge.

== Episodes ==
No. overall	No. in season	Title	Original release date	U.S. viewers (millions)	18-49 Rating
70	1	"Life and Death"	July 22, 2014	1.20	0.5
Sudden Death Challenge: The artists are informed that they are not actively on the show and two of them will be eliminated. They have two options, Life and Death. At each station, there is a box with a prosthetic inside that must be incorporated. They are also given an accessory that must be included.; Guest: Robert Englund Top Looks: Dina - Life Keaghlan - Life Sasha - Death Vince - Death Safe: Barry - Life Cig - Life Damien - Death Doc - Death Drew - Death George - Life Rachael - Life Stella - Life Bottom Looks: Gabby - Death Gwen - Death Jason - Death Scott - Life Winner: Dina Eliminated: Gabby & Scott
71	2	"American Gangster"	July 29, 2014	1.05	0.4
Spotlight Challenge: The artists must create their very own over-the-top crime boss inspired by the nickname of a real life gangster.; Guest: Doug Drexler Top Looks: Cig & George - Tony "Big Tuna" Accardo Doc & Stella - Leonard "Needles" Gianola Rachael & Vince - Charles "The Typewriter" Nicoletti Safe: Damien & Keaghlan - Opal "Mack Truck" Long Drew & Gwen - Michele "The Shark" Sindona Bottom Looks: Barry & Sasha - Allie "Tick-Tock" Tannenbaum Dina & Jason - John "Peanuts" Tronolone Winner: Cig Eliminated: Barry
72	3	"Ancient Aliens"	August 5, 2014	1.16	0.4
Spotlight Challenge: On their first individual spotlight challenge, the artists must create an alien creature that may have inspired the creation of different structures around the world. Seven ancient wonders that they were to choose from included: the Giza Necropolis, Easter Island, Stonehenge, Machu Picchu, the Pyramid of the Sun, the Peruvudaiyar Kovil, and Angkor Wat.; Top Looks: Keaghlan - Giza Necropolis Sasha - Peruvudaiyar Kovil Stella - Peruvudaiyar Kovil Safe: Cig - Angkor Wat Dina - Temple of the Sun Drew - Temple of the Sun George - Machu Picchu Jason - Machu Picchu Rachael - Stonehenge Vince - Easter Island Bottom Looks: Damien - Giza Necropolis Doc - Easter Island Gwen - Stonehenge Winner: Stella Eliminated: Gwen
73	4	"Twisted Trees"	August 12, 2014	1.30	0.5
Foundation Challenge: The artists must create make-ups based on a superhero costume of their choice. The winner of the challenge receives immunity.; Guest: Mike Elizalde Top Looks: Vince Rachael Winner: Rachael: Spotlight Challenge: In teams of two, the artists must create a twisted tree creature using their choice of tree species and an assigned malady.; Top Looks: Stella & Sasha - White Birch (w/ burls) Doc & Jason - Bristlecone Pine (struck by lightning) Safe: Dina & Rachael - Banyan (w/ fungus) George & Keaghlan - Silk Floss Tree (w/ choking vines) Bottom Looks: Cig & Drew - Weeping Willow (w/ bug infestation) Vince & Damien - Sequoia (w/ rot) Winner: Jason Eliminated: Vince
74	5	"Animal Attraction"	August 19, 2014	1.22	0.5
Spotlight Challenge: The artists must create a hybrid creature of two animals of their choice.; Top Looks: Sasha - Tawny owl & Bobcat Cig - Armadillo & Alligator Damien - Tawny owl & Coatimundi Safe: George - Armadillo & Alligator Dina - Prairie dog & Red fox Rachael - Coatimundi & Fennec fox Drew - Red fox & Squirrel monkey Jason - Red-tailed hawk & Fennec fox Bottom Looks: Stella - Kinkajou & Serval wildcat Doc - Bald eagle & Squirrel monkey Keaghlan - Kinkajou & Eurasian lynx Winner: Damien Eliminated: Doc
75	6	"Wizard of Wonderland"	August 26, 2014	1.24	0.5
Spotlight Challenge: The artists must create Wizard of Oz characters that have come to Wonderland.; Top Looks: Dina & Stella - Winged Monkey Keaghlan & Rachael - Tin Woodman Safe: Drew & George - Wicked Witch of the West Bottom Looks: Damien & Cig - Scarecrow Jason & Sasha - Cowardly Lion Winner: Dina Eliminated: Jason
76	Special	"Judge Match"	September 2, 2014	1.22	0.5
Spotlight Challenge: In a special episode of Face Off, for the first time, the judges (Neville, Ve and Glenn) will compete against each other. However, instead of competing alone, they will each get help from two former contestants of the show. The returning contestants are: Conor (from season 1), Roy (from seasons 3 and 5), Anthony (from season 4), Miranda (from seasons 2 and 5), Laura (from seasons 3 and 5), and Wayne (from season 4). The task for each team is to create two living chess pieces for a fantasy movie; one representing "good" and the other representing "evil". The winning team will win US$5,000 for a charity of the judge's choice as well as US$5,000 for each of the returning contestants of the winning team. The teams' creations will be judged by mentor Michael Westmore, season 7 judge Lois Burwell and host McKenzie Westmore. The winner, however, will be decided by each team's participants voting for their favorite creations (except their own).; Ve, Conor & Roy (playing for the charity "A Window Between Worlds") - Queen (evil) & Rook (good) Neville, Anthony & Miranda (playing for the "Orangutan Foundation") - Bishop (evil) & Pawn (good) Glenn, Laura & Wayne (playing for the "North Shore Animal League") - King (evil) & Knight (good) Winners: Neville, Anthony & Miranda
77	7	"Killer Instinct"	September 9, 2014	1.25	0.5
Foundation Challenge: The artists must create their own take on the Bloody Mary. The winner of the challenge receives immunity.; Guest: Brigette Myre Ellis Top Looks: Drew Rachael Winner: Rachael: Spotlight Challenge: The artist must choose a horror movie poster and use its title, imagery, and tagline to create the villain of that movie. The winner of this challenge will also have their movie villain featured in Universal Studios' Halloween Horror Nights in Hollywood and Orlando.; Top Looks: Cig - The Second Chumming : "Swim At Your Own Risk." Rachael - Bone Appetit : "Dinner Is Served." George - Axe Girlfriend : "Breakups can be hell." Safe: Drew - We Met Online : "There's No Escape Key." Damien - Buzzcut : "Just a little off the top." Stella - The Trophy Room : "It's hunting season." Bottom Looks: Keaghlan - Homecoming Scream : "Save the last dance." Sasha - Bonnie & Cyanide : "A Toxic Romance." Dina - The Cloven : "It was just too hot in Hell..." Winner: George Eliminated: N/A Saved: Sasha
78	8	"Serpent Soldiers"	September 16, 2014	1.32	0.5
Spotlight Challenge: Working for the G.I. Joe franchise, the artists will have to create a super soldier while using a snake as inspiration. The winner of this challenge also wins a prize package of G.I. Joe 50th Anniversary action figures.; Top Looks: Cig - Christmas Tree Eyelash Viper Drew - Tiger Rat Snake Dina - Rainbow Boa Safe: Stella - Namibian Coral Cobra Damien - Gaboon Viper George - Green Anaconda Bottom Looks: Sasha - Hognosed Snake Keaghlan - Albino Reticulated Python Rachael - Green Tree Python Winner: Dina Eliminated: Keaghlan
79	9	"Scared Silly"	September 23, 2014	1.30	0.6
Spotlight Challenge: The artists must create evil clown characters inspired by their childhood fears who will have to perform a circus act.; Top Looks: Cig - Hydroskourphobia: fear of dark water Dina - Lilapophobia: fear of tornadoes Sasha - Pediophobia: fear of old porcelain dolls Safe: George - Vermiphobia: fear of worms Rachael - Katsaridphobia: fear of cockroaches Stella - Teraphobia: fear of monsters under the bed Bottom Looks: Damien - Arachnophobia: fear of spiders Drew - Arachnophobia: fear of spiders Winner: Sasha Eliminated: Damien
80	10	"Teacher's Pets"	September 30, 2014	1.30	0.6
Spotlight Challenge: The artists create fun mythical fantasy characters based on classic high school stereotypes.; Not Chosen: Jock Cyclops Top Looks: Cig - Nerd Minotaur- Manny Minotaury; Freshman Drew - Emo Faun- Lawrence "Devin" Faunda; Junior Safe: Dina - Nerd Goblin- Meg Oblin; Junior Sasha - Cheerleader Cyclops- Olivia Lids; Senior Stella - Emo Minotaur- Elizabeth Mino; Sophomore Bottom Looks: George - Jock Goblin- Doug Oblin; Senior Rachael - Cheerleader Faun- Courtney Faunda; Senior Winner: Drew Eliminated: Rachael
81	11	"Off with Their Heads"	October 7, 2014	1.26	0.6
Foundation Challenge: The artists must create a victim of Medusa that has been turned to stone. The winner will receive a $2,000 spray paint booth as a prize.; Guest: Michèle Burke Top Looks: George Stella Winner: Stella: Spotlight Challenge: The artists must create Greek god or goddess characters, along with a severed head of a monster that they have slain.; Guest Judge: Scott Wilson Dina: Aphrodite (Seashell) Cig: Apollo (Golden lyre) Drew: Hades (Horn) Sasha: Athena (Shield) George: Zeus (Thunder & Lightning) Stella: Poseidon (Trident) Not Chosen: Artemis (Bow & Arrow) Not Chosen: Demeter (Grain) Top Looks: Dina - Aphrodite with anglerfish head Safe: Cig - Apollo with diseased creature head Stella - Poseidon with murloc head Drew - Hades with imp head Bottom Looks: Sasha - Athena with Medusa head George - Zeus with crustcean titan head Winner: Dina Eliminated: Sasha.
82	12	"Beautiful Disaster"	October 14, 2014	1.20	0.5
Spotlight Challenge: The artists must create beautiful elemental fairies that were born from disastrous scenarios.; Top Looks: George - Earthquake - Earth Fairy Dina - Flood - Wood Fairy Cig - Avalanche - Ice Fairy Bottom Looks: Drew - Oil spill - Water Fairy Stella - Wildfire - Fire Fairy Winner: Cig Eliminated: Stella.
83	13	"Creature Carnage"	October 21, 2014	1.26	0.5
Spotlight Challenge: The artists must choose a newspaper headline to inspire a giant, rampaging monster reminiscent of King Kong and the Godzilla franchise.; Guest Judge: Clifton Collins Jr. Dina: "Mantis Preys on Paris" Cig: "Yeti Crab Crushes Kremlin" Drew: "Giant Sloth Slashes Shanghai" George: "Deadly Squid Destroys Dubai" Not Chosen: "Taj Terrorized by Pterodactyl" Winner: Dina - Praying Mantis Safe: Cig - Yeti Crab Drew - Giant Sloth Eliminated: George - Squid.
84	14	"One Knight Only"	October 28, 2014	1.39	0.6
Spotlight Challenge: On the season finale of Face Off, the finalists must create two knight characters (one representing "life" and the other representing "death") inspired by a specific coat of arms. The knights will then duel in an arena. The finalists also received help from eliminated contestants this season and past winners of the show.; Dina - assisted by Stella and season 3 winner, Nicole, inspired by an aquatic-themed coat of arms featuring an octopus Cig - assisted by Sasha and season 6 winner, Rashaad, inspired by a coat of arms featuring gargoyles and a crescent moon Drew - assisted by George and season 2 winner, Rayce, inspired by a coat of arms featuring a stag's head Not Chosen - A coat of arms featuring topaz and scorpions. Winner: Dina
