= Cinema Makeup School =

Private, for-profit makeup training school located in Los Angeles, USA

Coordinates: 34°3′43″N 118°18′33″W

- Type: Private
- Established: 1993
- Location: Los Angeles, California, United States

Cinema Makeup School is a private, for-profit makeup training school located in Los Angeles. The school was founded in 1993. Specialties include beauty make-up for film and television as well as fashion and editorial purposes, hairstyling, airbrushing and bodypainting, character make-up, special make-up effects and prosthetics, creature maquette sculpture and digital makeup effects design, along with Advanced Lab Techniques and Advanced Beauty Techniques.

Several graduates of the school have appeared as contestants on Syfy's reality game show Face Off.
