= Face Off (American TV series) =

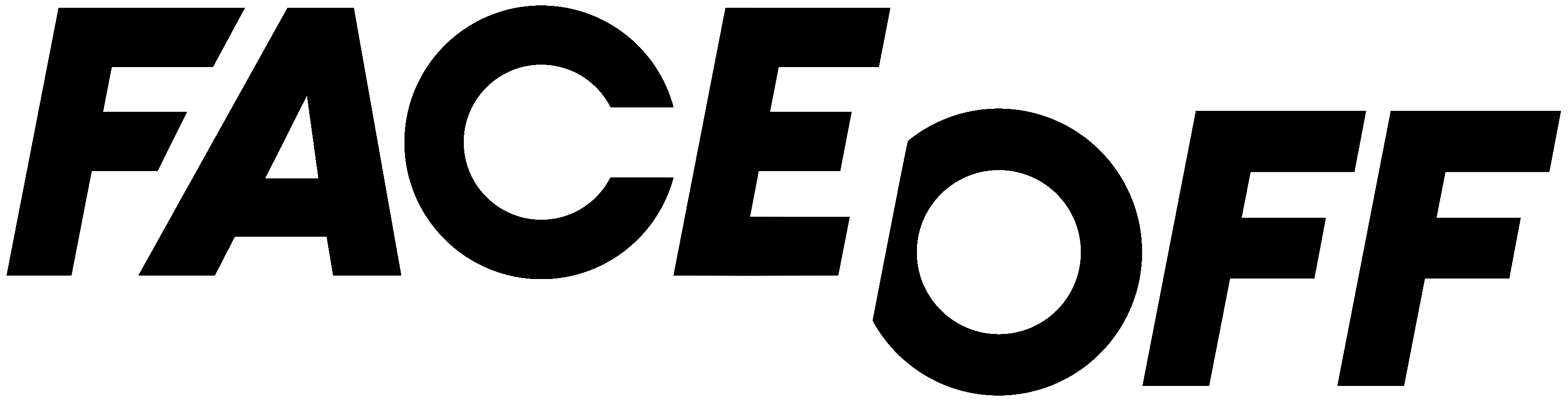
- Genre: Reality show Game show
- Presented by: McKenzie Westmore
- Judges: Glenn Hetrick; Ve Neill; Patrick Tatopoulos (1-3); Neville Page (3-13); Lois Burwell (7); Michael Westmore (mentor)
- Country of origin: United States
- Original language: English
- No. of seasons: 13
- No. of episodes: 160 (list of episodes)

Production
- Executive producers: Dwight D. Smith; Michael Agbabian; Derek Atherton; Mary Celenza
- Production locations: Los Angeles, California
- Editor: Martin McBride
- Production company: Mission Control Media

Original release
- Network: Syfy
- Release: January 26, 2011 – August 7, 2018

Face Off is an American reality television game show program on the SyFy cable network channel in which a group of prosthetic makeup artists compete against each other to create prostheses such as those found in science fiction, fantasy, and horror films. One or more challenges are featured in each episode, with the work reviewed by a panel of judges who eliminate one or more artists each week until a final winner is chosen.

Actress McKenzie Westmore, known for her role as Sheridan Crane on the former NBC/DirecTV soap opera Passions and a member of the Westmore family of makeup artists, serves as the show's host while her father, Michael Westmore, serves as the show's mentor (seasons 4-13). For each assignment, the contestants' work is individually evaluated by a panel of professional special effects makeup artists who serve as judges. These judges have included television and film makeup artist Glenn Hetrick, Academy- and Emmy Award–winning makeup artist Ve Neill, creature designer and director Patrick Tatopoulos (seasons 1-3), and creature and concept designer Neville Page (seasons 3-13). Industry figures and artists including Brian Grazer, Kevin Smith, Paul W. S. Anderson, Greg Nicotero, Rick Baker, Doug Jones, Len Wiseman, Gale Anne Hurd and Marcus Nispel have served as guest judges.

Face Off premiered January 26, 2011 on Syfy. In August 2017, Syfy aired the first season of spin-off series Face Off: Game Face, which brings back four all-stars from previous Face Off seasons for each episode and pits them head-to-head in three rounds for a chance to win US$10,000.

== Format ==
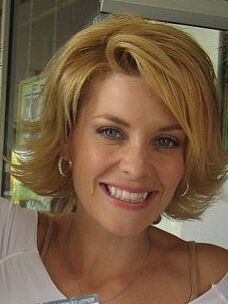
McKenzie Westmore served as the show's host.

Face Off is presented as a progressive elimination competition between 12 and 16 make-up artists. Each week, the artists face a "Spotlight Challenge" that tests their artistry and techniques to create a full makeup character to match a theme over the course of 3 days. The first day allows for concept design and sculpting for five hours, a second day of 9½ to 10 hours for work in finishing the molding, and a final day of 4 hours in applying the makeup before a one-hour "Last Look" for touch ups. The judges then have the opportunity to look at the makeups from afar and up close, and decide a series of top and bottom looks for the week. One artist will be deemed the winner, sometimes receiving a special bonus prize such as immunity from elimination or a cash reward, and one artist will be eliminated from the running for the grand prize. Some episodes also feature a "Foundation Challenge", a smaller challenge that introduces a new technique on a smaller scale, and the winner is awarded an advantage for that week's Spotlight Challenge, ranging from immunity from elimination to receiving a first choice of theme. More recent seasons have included a "Gauntlet" challenge, where the artists must complete in three rounds of challenges over two days, with either rounds scored on a point system to determine the winner and loser, or the winners of individual rounds considered safe and do not need to participate in the future rounds.

The elimination format proceeds until three or four contestants are left. At this point, they get a larger assignment typically involving makeup for two or more actors for a short film or similar setpiece to feature their work. The judges review the make-up within the context of this final setpiece to determine the winner. The Face Off winner receives US$100,000 and a year's supply of makeup from Alcone (changed to US$25,000 of makeup in season 2), a "grand prize that will launch a career". The second season added the 2012 Toyota Camry Hybrid to its prize package. The Season 3 grand prize winner will receive the same US$25,000 of Alcone makeup and US$100,000 cash prize, in addition to the opportunity to become a guest lecturer at the "Make up for Ever Academy" in New York and Paris, and the Toyota Prius v. The prize package for season 4 remains the same with the exception of the 2013 Fiat 500 replacing the Prius V as the prize vehicle.

== Production and development ==
Syfy began the development of Face Off in March 2010 in association with the production company Mission Control Media. Syfy confirmed that it had ordered the series in May, and announced the host and judges in November. Producers held open casting calls in Los Angeles and Orlando, Florida and accepted audition videos through 15 September 2010.

== Seasons ==
Season	Premiere	Finale	Winner	Runners-Up	Number of contestants	Number of episodes
1	January 26, 2011	March 16, 2011	Conor McCullagh	Gage Hubbard; Tate Steinsiek	12	8
2	January 11, 2012	March 14, 2012	Rayce Bird	Ian Cromer; Robert "RJ" Haddy	14	10
3	August 21, 2012	October 31, 2012	Nicole Chilelli	Laura Dandridge; Derek Garcia	12	12
4	January 15, 2013	March 26, 2013	Anthony Kosar	Kristian "Kris" Kobzina; Wayne Anderson	14	11
5	August 13, 2013	November 5, 2013	Laura Dandridge	Tate Steinsiek; Roy Wooley	16	13
6	January 14, 2014	April 22, 2014	Rashaad Santiago	George Schminky; Tyler Green	15	15
7	July 22, 2014	October 28, 2014	Dina Cimarusti	Cig Neutron; Drew Talbot	16	14
8	January 13, 2015	April 14, 2015	Darla Edin	Emily Serpico; Logan Long	15	14
9	July 28, 2015	October 27, 2015	Nora Hewitt	Ben Ploughman; Evan Hedges	16	14
10	January 13, 2016	April 13, 2016	Rob Seal	Micah Ebbe; Walter Welsh	14	14
11	January 24, 2017	April 25, 2017	Cig Neutron	Emily Serpico; George Troester III	16	14
12	June 13, 2017	August 22, 2017	Andrew Freeman	KC Mussman; Kierstin Lapatka	12	10
13	June 5, 2018	August 7, 2018	Matt Valentine	Jordan Patton; Walter Welsh	12	10

=== Season 1 (2011) ===
The first season of Face Off was won by Conor McCullagh of Orlando, Florida. Face Off Season 1 drew an average audience of 1.4 million viewers per episode during season 1. Contestants on season 1 were: Megan Areford, Tom Devlin, Kayla "Jo" Holland, Sergio Guerra, Frank Ippolito, Jessica Kramer, Marcel Banks, Samantha "Sam" Cobb, Tate Steinsiek, Gage Hubbard, Anthony Pepe, and Conor McCullagh (Winner).

=== Season 2 (2012) ===
The second season of Face Off was won by Rayce Bird of Shelley, Idaho. Season 2 premiere episode posted the best ratings performance for any Syfy original series since November '09, even increasing from those ratings in subsequent episodes. The finale drew over 2.4 million viewers, and was SyFy's most watched unscripted telecast ever. Contestants on season 2 were: Miranda Jory, Greg Lightner, Jerry Macaluso, Beki Ingram, Heather Henry, Ian Cromer, Robert "RJ" Haddy, Sue Lee, Tara Lang, Matt Valentine, Nicholas "Nix" Herrera, Brea Joseph, Athena Zhe, and Rayce Bird (Winner).

=== Season 3 (2012) ===
Syfy held open call auditions for the third season on November 19, 2011 in Los Angeles, California and Orlando, Florida. Filming began during the spring of 2012 to be ready for a summer release. The third season of Face Off premiered on August 21, 2012. The selected contestants were revealed to the public on June 29, 2012. This is the first season of the show where two relatives have been selected as contestants: fraternal twin brothers Eric and Derek Garcia were among those chosen to participate. While Neill and Hetrick remain as judges, concept designer Neville Page became a replacement judge with Tatopoulos appearing in the season premiere, a subsequent episode, and the finale. The season finale was broadcast live on Halloween, October 31, 2012 and viewers voted for the winner. Halfway through the season the first five eliminated contestants (excluding Joe Castro who was the first contestant ever disqualified from the competition in the season premiere) were allowed to compete in a foundation challenge, with the victor returning to the show. This challenge was won by Nicole Chilelli of Sacramento, California, who went on to become this season's champion. Contestants on season 3 were: Thomas "Tommy" Pietch, Joe Castro, Sarah Elizabeth Miller, Alana Rose Schiro, Roy Wooley, Laura Dandridge, Rod Maxwell, Jason Milani, Derek Garcia, Eric Garcia, Carpucine "C.C." Childs, and Nicole Chilelli (Winner).

=== Season 4 (2013) ===
Syfy picked up Face Off for a fourth season on October 9, 2012 which premiered January 15, 2013. A sneak peek of the upcoming season premiered during the live season 3 finale. Season 4 was won by Anthony Kosar of Chicago, Illinois. Contestants on season 4 were: Kristian "Kris" Kobzina, Wayne Anderson, Alexandra "Alex" McCoy, Meagan Hester, Jenna Green, Eric Zapata, Autumn Cook, Troy Rivers, Michael Faust, Alam Park, David "House' Greathouse, Eric Fox, Katie Machaiek, and Anthony Kosar (Winner).

=== Season 5 (2013) ===
Syfy picked up Face Off for a fifth season. During season 4's Face-Off redemption, Eric Zapata won a place as one of the eight returning contestants who are to compete against eight new contestants. This was the second season that a contestant voluntarily left the competition, when Laney Parkhurst departed in episode 11. The season was won by Laura Dandridge of Orlando, Florida, who was a finalist on season 3. Contestants on season 5 were: Alaina "Laney" Parkhurst, Rick Prince, Eddie Holecko, Steve Tolin, Samantha "Sam" Allen, Adolfo Barreto Rivera, Lyma Millot, Scott Ramp, Alana Rose Schiro, Roy Wooley, Tate Steinsiek, Miranda Jory, Frank Ippolito, Eric Zapata, Robert "RJ" Haddy, and Laura Dandridge (Winner).

=== Season 6 (2014) ===
Season 6 started January 14, 2014. This season was won by Rashaad Santiago of The Bronx, New York City, New York. This season had a theme of "extremes". During this season the judges had the power to save one contestant who would have normally been eliminated. This season also featured a trip to Tokyo, Japan, where the artists competed in an Oni foundation challenge and found inspiration for an Anime spotlight challenge. Contestants on season 6 were: Margaret Caragan, Graham Schofield, Matt Silva, Tess Laeh, Tanner White, George Schminky, Daran Holt, Bethany Serpico, Niko Gonzalez, Cat Paschen, Chloe Sens, Daniel Phillips, Corinne Foster, Tyler Green, and Rashaad Santiago (Winner).

=== Season 7 (2014) ===
Season 7 was announced on April 18, 2014. It premiered on July 22, 2014. This season features a fourth judge, Lois Burwell. Season 7 was won by Dina Cimarusti of Chicago, Illinois. This season also focused on the theme of "life and death" and used this theme for many of the challenges. This season employed the one-time save of an eliminated contestant that was introduced in season 6. Contestants on season 7 were: Rachael Wagner, Damien Zimmerman, Jason Hodges, David "Doc" O'Connell, Drew Talbot, Keaghlan Ashley, Gabby Leithsceal, Scott Mitchell, Cig Neutron, Vince Niebla, Stella Sensel, Sasha Glasser, Gwen Crew, George Troester III, Barry Mahoney, and Dina Cimarusti (Winner).

=== Season 8 (2015) ===
Season 8 was announced on October 22, 2014. It was premiered on January 13, 2015. During this season the 15 new artists are placed into three teams of five, each coached by a previous winner of Face Off. The coaches were Rayce Bird (Season 2 Winner), Anthony Kosar (Season 4 Winner), and Laura Dandridge (Season 3 Runner Up, Season 5 Winner). If every member of a coaches team is eliminated, that coach leaves the competition as well. This season was won by Darla Edin of Minneapolis, Minnesota. She was part of Team Laura, making Laura the first person to win Face Off twice. Contestants on season 8 were: Jamie Leodones, Adam Milicevic, Logan Long, Regina Jiganti, Daniel Prado, Rob Miller, Emily Serpico, Stephanie Masco, Ben Peter, Kelly Harris, Anthony Reyes, Gregory Hewett, Alan Carnes, Julian Bonfiglio, and Darla Edin (Winner).

=== Season 9 (2015) ===
Season 9 was announced on April 8, 2015. It premiered on July 28, 2015. This season had a theme of "surprises" and featured two new challenge formats: focus challenges and The Gauntlet. In a focus challenge, the artists are given two days (as opposed to the usual three allotted for a spotlight challenge) to create a makeup that focuses on the face and strong application is emphasized. The Gauntlet is a series of three consecutive foundation challenges, each testing a different aspect of the artists' abilities. The least successful artist after the three rounds is eliminated. The season finale took place on October 27, 2015. The winner of season 9 was Nora Hewitt of Barkhamsted, Connecticut. Contestants on season 9 were: Kevon Ward, Megan "Meg" Wilbur, Jason Henricks, Libby Rose, Melissa "Missy Munster" Stell, Sidney Cumbie, Jordan Patton, Evan Hedges, Scott Fensterer, Ricky Vitus, Jasmine Ringo, Omar Sfreddo, Ben Ploughman, Stevie Calabrese, Brittany Leslie, and Nora Hewitt (Winner).

=== Season 10 (2016) ===
Season 10 was announced on October 27, 2015. It premiered on January 13, 2016. In this season the judges were allowed to save one contestant who would normally be eliminated, a device previously used in seasons 6 and 7. The winner of this season was Rob Seal of Lake View Terrace, California. Contestants on season 10 were: Jennifer Bowden, Samuel "Njoroge" Karumba, Micah Ebbe, Anthony "Ant" Canonica, Johnny Leftwich, Greg Schrantz, Katie Kinney, Anna Cali, Kaleb Lewis, Walter Welsh, Yvonne Cox, Robert Lindsay, Melanie "Mel" Licata, and Robert "Rob" Seal (Winner).

=== Season 11 (2017) ===
Season 11 premiered on January 24, 2017. The season featured an all star cast of 16 returning contestants and had all of them working in teams of two until episode 8. From this episode 9, the competition is individual. The winner was Cig Neutron of Los Angeles, California, who was a finalist in Season 7. Contestants on season 11 were: Niko Gonzalez, Jasmine Ringo, Stella Sensel, Gage Hubbard, George Troester III, Tyler Green, Ben Ploughman, Cat Paschen, Adam Milicevic, Logan Long, Evan Hedges, Emily Serpico, Rachael Wagner, Keaghlan Ashley, Micah Ebbe, and Cig Neutron (Winner).

=== Season 12 (2017) ===
Season 12 premiered on June 13, 2017. This season, 12 new artists were split into two competing FX shops. The winner of this season was Andrew Freeman of Glendora, California. Contestants on season 12 were: Jill Burgner, Suzanne Bostwick, Al Tuskes, Nick Fischer, KC Mussman, Phil Harrah, Nelson Cooper, Faina Rudshteyn, Laura McCormick, Joseph Drobezko, Kierstin Lapatka, and Andrew Freeman (Winner).

=== Season 13 (2018) ===
Season 13 was announced on January 6, 2018. An all-star edition consisting of past favorites, it was the final season. A petition to continue the show after Season 13 was created May 3, 2018, and has received 26,383 signatures, including William Shatner. Contestants on season 13 were: Damien Zimmerman, Kelly Harris, Melanie "Mel" Licata, Yvonne Cox, Derek Garcia, Sasha Glasser, Kayla "Jo" Holland, Graham Schofield, Walter Welsh, Kevon Ward, Jordan Patton, and Matt Valentine (Winner).

== Cast appearance chart ==
Host

- McKenzie Westmore

Judges

- Glenn Hetrick (2011 - 2017)
- Ve Neill (2011 - 2014; 2015–17)
- Neville Page (2012 - 2017)
- Patrick Tatopoulos (2011 - 2012)
- Lois Burwell (2014 - 2015)

Mentor

- Michael Westmore

Timeline
