= Nine of Swords =

Minor Arcana tarot card

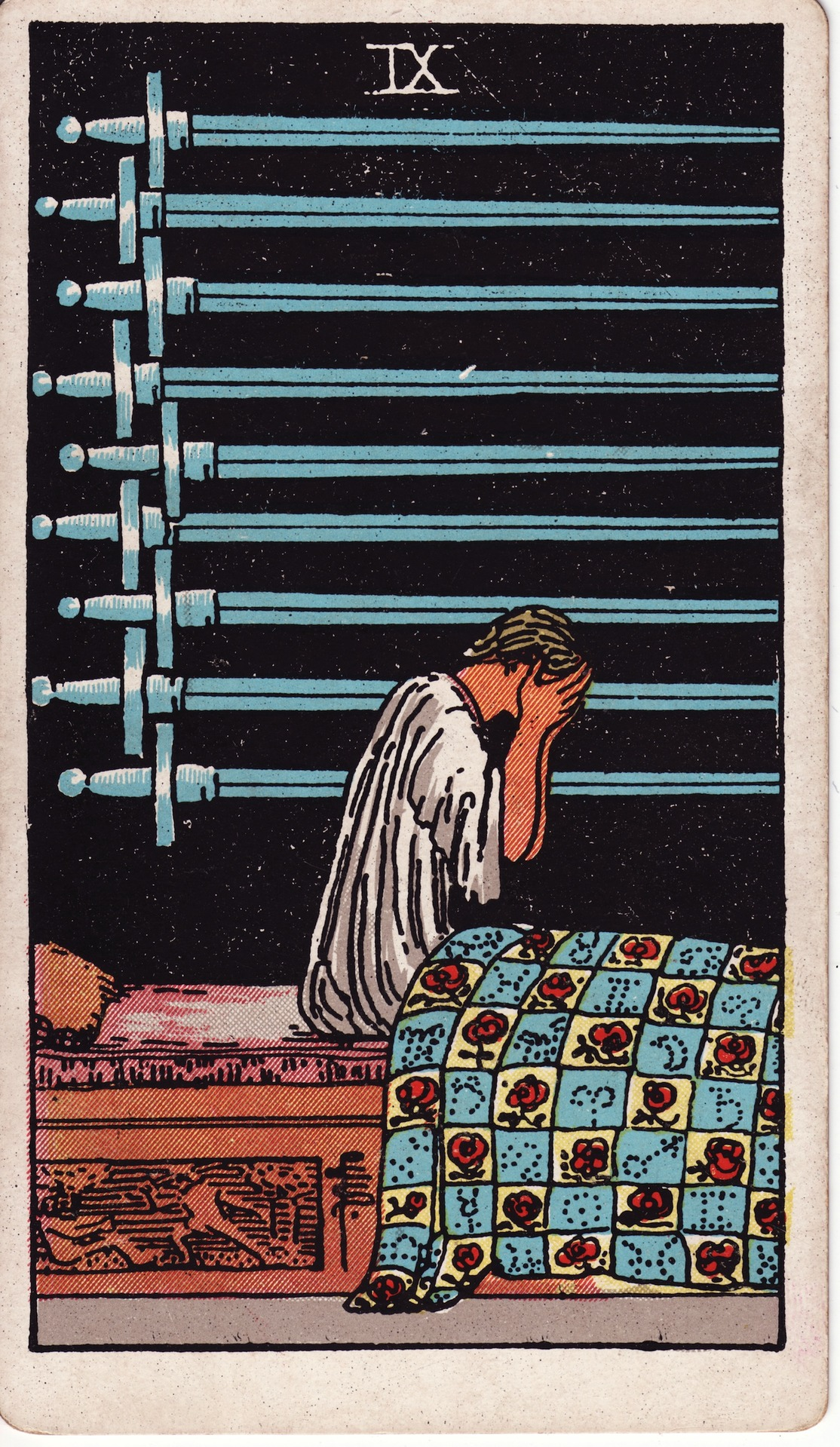
Nine of Swords from the Rider–Waite tarot deck

The Nine of Swords is a Minor Arcana tarot card, also known as the Lord of Cruelty. In many countries around Europe it is used as a game card. This card has the numerical value of nine.

According to certain traditions and beliefs, tarot cards are believed to tell the future, or have a divination usage. According to these traditions, it is a very negative sign to have this card be turned. It is believed that it being turned can be instigated by others, as it might be coming up to show that one has been cruel to someone nearby.

== Card appearance and meaning ==
This card often shows a figure sitting up in bed, with nine swords above him. The illustration represents pain from within resulting from worry, guilt, and pure anguish.

== Divination usage ==
If this card is shown in an upright position, it can mean deception, premonitions and bad dreams, suffering and depression, cruelty, disappointment, violence, loss and scandal. However, all of these may be overcome through faith and calculated inaction. This is the card of the martyr and with it comes new life out of suffering.

This card can represent being plagued by fear, guilt, doubt, and worries that are to a large extent, unfounded. Chances are the person in question is dealing with a problematic situation or a difficult decision, but his or her worst fear is unlikely to materialize.

If the card is shown in an ill-dignified or reversed manner then it has a different meaning. When turned this way it means distrust, suspicion, despair, misery or malice. Total isolation away from comfort and help: institutionalization, suicide, imprisonment and isolation. However, in a generally positive spread, the reversed meaning of this card can also indicate that the nightmare may be ending. The nine of swords reversed can actually be a hopeful card, counselling faith in the future and the promise of better days ahead.
