= Python Bridge =

The Bridge Pythonbrug
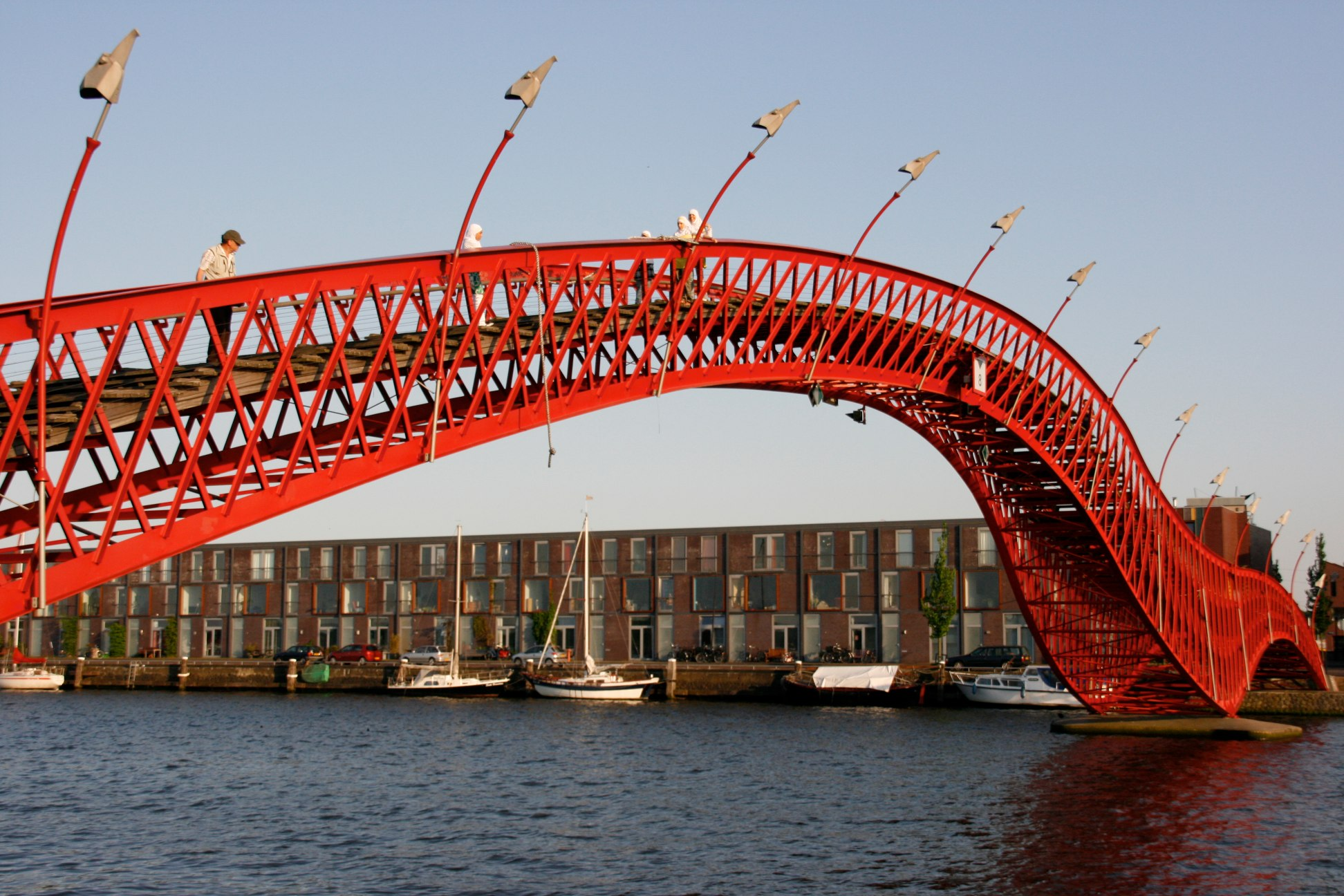
- Python Bridge
- Coordinates: 52°22′23″N 4°56′56″E
- Carries: Pedestrians
- Crosses: Canal
- Locale: Eastern Docklands, Amsterdam
- Official name: Hoge Brug

Characteristics
- Material: Steel
- Longest span: 90 meters

History
- Designer: Adriaan Geuze

Location
- Interactive map of The Bridge

Python Bridge, officially known as High Bridge (Hoge Brug), is a bridge that spans the canal between Sporenburg and Borneo Island in Eastern Docklands, Amsterdam.

== History ==
It was built in 2001 and won the International Footbridge Award in 2002. The bright red bridge spans 90 meters and was designed by Adriaan Geuze of the architectural firm West 8.

== Uniqueness ==
The bridge only carries pedestrians.

The visually similar Lage Brug (Low bridge) is nearby. It is similar but without the high elevation, which allows cyclists to ride over it.

This bridge was also made famous by the Storror parkour team. The team used the bridge to do a hanging challenge and used a rope to swing off of.
