= Wood Elf =

Wood elf is a generic term for an elf that lives in wooded areas such as forests.

Wood Elf may refer to:

- Silvan Elves, a fictional race in J.R.R. Tolkien's Middle-earth of northern Mirkwood and Lothlórien
- Wood Elves, a subrace of elves in Dungeons & Dragons
- Wood Elves (Warhammer), a fictional race in the Warhammer universe
- EverQuest, a 1999 player character race in the video game series, similar to those of Tolkien's fiction
- Wood Elves are playable characters in the game Sacred
- Wood Elves are also found in The Elder Scrolls series, known as Bosmers
