= Patrick Tatopoulos =

French production designer and director

- Born: September 25, 1957 (age 69); Paris, France
- Occupation: Production designer
- Spouse: McKenzie Westmore (m. 2015)
- Children: 2

Patrick Tatopoulos (born September 25, 1957) is a Greek-French production designer and director who lives and works in the United States. His designs have appeared in numerous motion pictures, including Pitch Black; Underworld; I, Robot; The Chronicles of Riddick; Independence Day; Bram Stoker's Dracula; Stargate; Spawn; Godzilla; Stuart Little; 300; I Am Legend; Man of Steel; Batman v Superman: Dawn of Justice; Justice League; 10,000 BC and Live Free or Die Hard.

== Early life ==
Tatopoulos was born and raised in Paris, France, to a French mother and an immigrant father from Greece. His parents had a clothing store in Paris. Tatopoulos raced motorcycles, worked in 2-D advertising and drew comic book covers. He lived in Greece for ten years before coming to the United States in 1989. He is a fluent speaker of English, Greek and French.

On October 11, 2015, Tatopoulos married Face Off host McKenzie Westmore. The couple met while working on the first season of the show. The wedding ceremony was held at Chateau Le Dome at Saddlerock Ranch Winery in Malibu, California. Tatopoulos is currently based in Los Angeles.

== Movie career ==
In Greece, while working as a designer artist in the production of commercials, he was continually fascinated by creatures and special effects. He studied at the École d'Art Décoratif de Paris, the École des Arts Appliqués de Paris, and the École des Beaux-Arts. From Paris he moved to Rome and Greece where he began selling his illustrations. Eventually, his passion for the entertainment business drew him to the United States and within a short time became a designer for commercials, music video and motion pictures. Tatopoulos is a frequent collaborator of directors Roland Emmerich, Alex Proyas, and Len Wiseman.

The main character in Godzilla (1998), Dr. Niko "Nick" Tatopoulos, played by Matthew Broderick, is named after Patrick, who designed the Godzilla for the film.

In May 2000, Tatopoulos was honored by The Hellenic Times at its ninth annual Scholarship Gala in New York. The goal of the organization is to identify young American scholars who best exemplify the values of their Greek heritage and provide them with educational support. A Patrick Tatopoulos Creative Arts Award Scholarship was created in 2001 and Tatopoulos has personally presented the scholarship, in his name, to a deserving student in 2001 and 2002. He owns Tatopoulos Studios, Inc. and Patrick Tatopoulos Designs, Inc.

He made his directorial debut with the 2009 film Underworld: Rise of the Lycans. He worked on the live action film adaptation of the Darkstorm Studios graphic novel I, Frankenstein, which was produced by Lakeshore Entertainment. The story follows the original monster of Victor Frankenstein who is the only force that stands between the human race and an uprising of supernatural creatures determined to overthrow the world. Filming kicked off in July 2010. The film was released in 2014. Tatopoulos created the creature figures of the upcoming Stan Winston produced Speed Demon. He will direct the action horror film Suspension, which based on a screenbook by Scott Millam.

Tatopoulos served as a judge for the first 2 seasons, appearing only several times on the third, on the Syfy original series Face Off which features makeup artists competing for $100,000.

== Collaborators ==
Tatopoulos has worked with the following directors on more than one film:

- Paul W. S. Anderson (Alien vs. Predator, Resident Evil: Extinction)
- Roland Emmerich (Stargate, Independence Day, Godzilla, 10,000 BC, 2012)
- Alex Proyas (Dark City, I, Robot, Knowing)
- David Twohy (Pitch Black, The Chronicles of Riddick, Riddick)
- Len Wiseman (Underworld, Underworld: Evolution, Live Free or Die Hard, Total Recall)
- Zack Snyder (Batman v Superman: Dawn of Justice, Justice League, Zack Snyder's Justice League)
- Christophe Gans (Silent Hill, Return to Silent Hill)

== Filmography ==
- The Doors (1991)
- Showdown in Little Tokyo (1991)
- Bram Stoker's Dracula (1992)
- Super Mario Bros. (1993)
- Stargate (1994)
- Space: Above and Beyond (1995)
- Se7en (1995)
- Jade (1995)
- Lawnmower Man 2: Beyond Cyberspace (1996)
- Independence Day (1996)
- Spawn (1997)
- Dark City (1998)
- Godzilla (1998)
- Stigmata (1999)
- Stuart Little (1999)
- Supernova (2000)
- Pitch Black (2000)
- Battlefield Earth (2000)
- Special Unit 2 (2001)
- Final Fantasy: The Spirits Within (2001)
- Saint Sinner (2002)
- They (2002)
- Underworld (2003)
- Van Helsing (2004)
- The Chronicles of Riddick (2004)
- I, Robot (2004)
- Alien vs. Predator (2004)
- The Librarian: Quest for the Spear (2004)
- The Cave (2005)
- Venom (2005)
- Underworld: Evolution (2006)
- Silent Hill (2006)
- Crank (2006)
- Eragon (2006)
- The Dead Girl (2006)
- Aquaman (2007)
- The Messengers (2007)
- Live Free or Die Hard (2007)
- Resident Evil: Extinction (2007)
- I Am Legend (2007)
- 10,000 BC (2008)
- The Ruins (2008)
- Outlander (2008)
- Pathology (2008)
- Starship Troopers 3: Marauder (2008)
- Underworld: Rise of the Lycans (2009) (Director)
- Blood Creek (2009)
- Solomon Kane (2009)
- Knowing (2009)
- 2012 (2009)
- Gallowwalker (2011)
- Underworld: Awakening (2012)
- Total Recall (2012)
- Silent Hill: Revelation 3D (2012)
- Riddick (2013)
- 300: Rise of an Empire (2014)
- Batman v Superman: Dawn of Justice (2016)
- Justice League (2017)
- Maleficent: Mistress of Evil (2019)
- Zack Snyder's Justice League (2021)
- Transformers: Rise of the Beasts (2023)
- The Last Voyage of the Demeter (2023)
- Damsel (2024)
- Return to Silent Hill (2026)
