= Kryolan =

Cosmetics company based in Berlin, Germany

Kryolan Professional Makeup
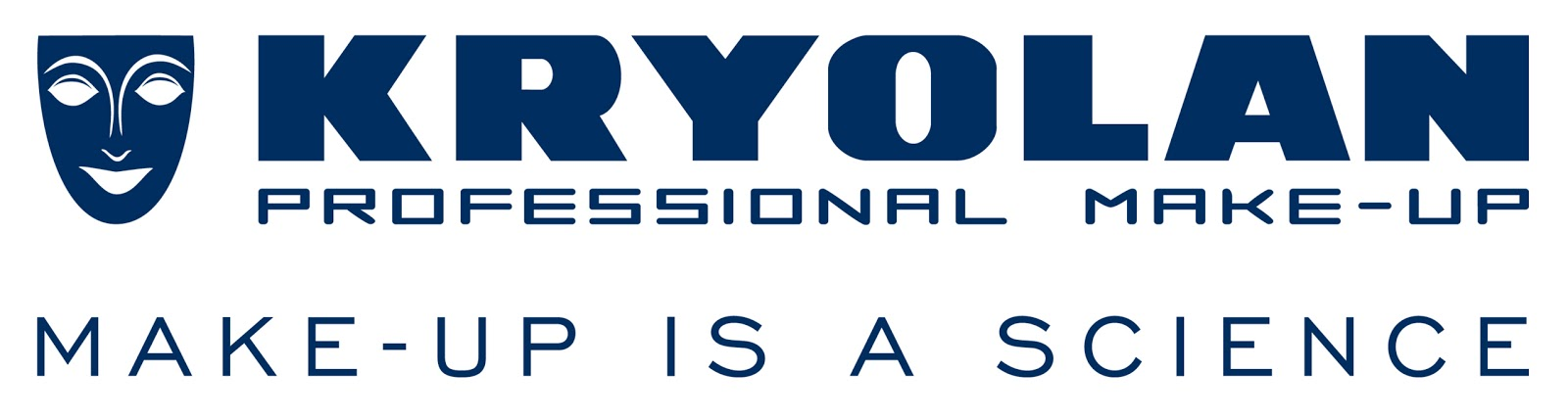
- Founded: Berlin, Germany (1945)
- Founders: Arnold Langer

Kryolan is a world-wide cosmetics company founded and headquartered in Berlin, Germany. By some estimates, Kryolan creates two-thirds of global production of professional makeup for film, TV and theater.

== History ==
Kryolan was founded in 1945 in post-World War II Berlin. Kryolan's Hollywood breakthrough came with the face masks used in the 1968 feature film Planet of the Apes.

In 1987, the company purchased a building in the center of San Francisco for its U.S. subsidiary, which subsequently became the new company domicile.

After intensive rebranding, Kryolan launched its "Make-Up Is A Science" campaign in 2012, which continues to this day. That same year, the German trade Association "The Family Entrepreneurs" (Die Familienunternehmer) honored Arnold Langer in Berlin as the "Family Entrepreneur of the Year".

== In media ==
Kryolan was featured in season 3 of the American reality competition television series RuPaul's Drag Race, wherein thirteen drag queens competed for a prize package that included a "lifetime supply" of Kryolan makeup.
