= Ve Neill =

American makeup artist (born 1951)

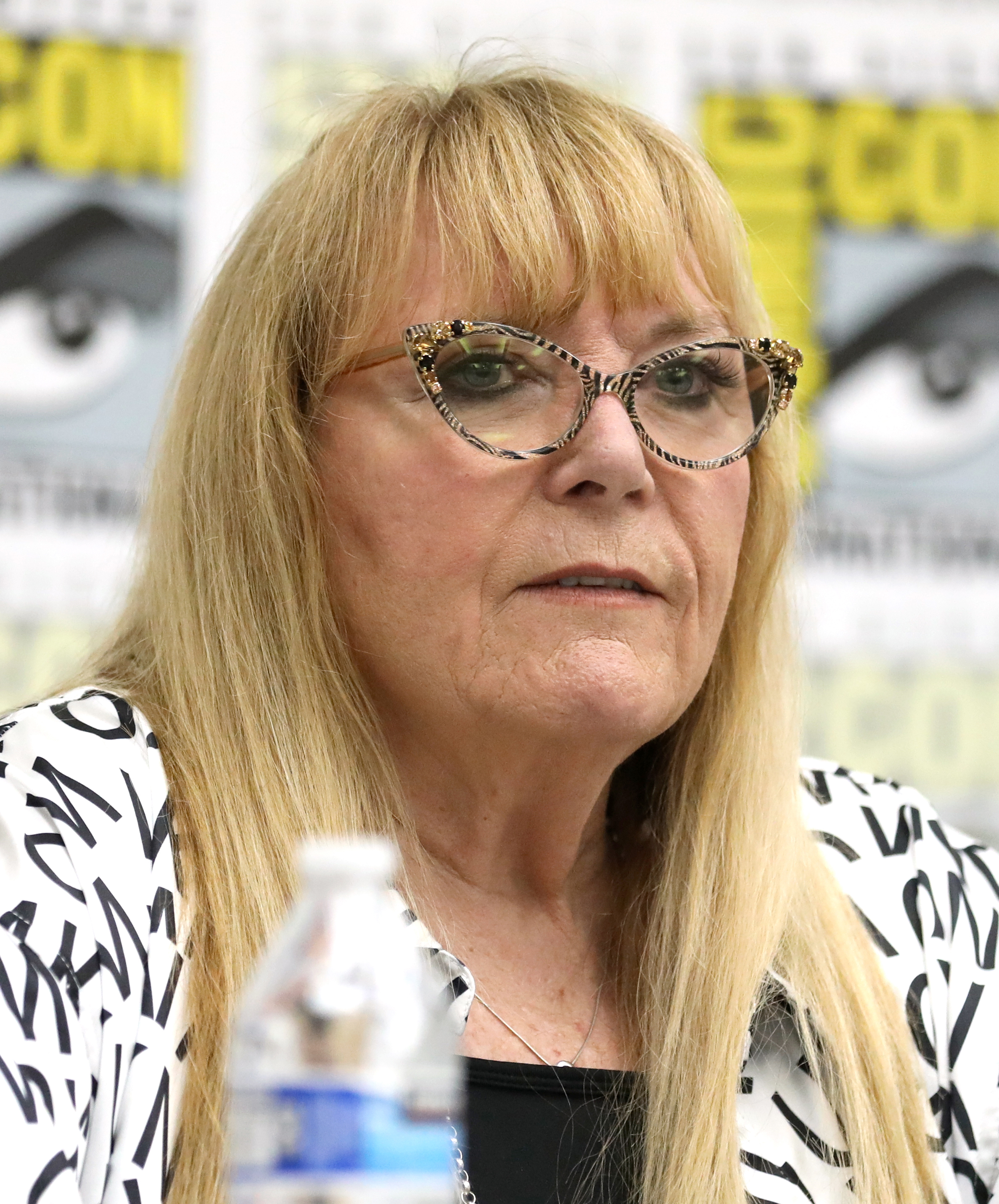
- Neill in 2023
- Born: Mary Flores; 1951 (age 74–75); Riverside, California, US
- Occupation: Makeup artist
- Years active: 1977–present

Ve Neill (born Mary Flores; 1951) is an American makeup artist. She has won three Academy Awards, for the films Beetlejuice, Mrs. Doubtfire and Ed Wood. She has been nominated for eight Oscars in total.

== Early life ==
Neill recounts that she aspired to be a make-up artist since the age of five and wanted to create monsters. As a child, she was known for painting the faces of her cousins with whatever was at hand, such as lipstick and shoe polish. Her interest in the makeup world was broadened by Leo Lotito, a make-up artist for TV shows who helped her with her Halloween costumes. A trip to a science-fiction convention at the age of 18 to gather inspiration ended with Fred Phillips taking her under his wing and a job on Star Trek: The Motion Picture.

== Make-Up ==
At the same Sci-Fi convention where she met Fred Phillips, Neill approached men dressed as characters from Planet of the Apes after learning that they made their own masks. When she asked them to teach her, one responded: “But you're a girl". This incident became part of her journey to learn all that she could and build her skills and techniques.

Neill credits self teaching, with the addition of other make-up artists showing her tips and tricks. She credits being able to examine the legendary work of John Chambers and Fred Phillips, in order to grow as an artist. While she was developing her skills, there was a lack of sharing between her and her male counterparts, as she was a woman and "they didn't want me in there anyway."

In interviews, she has also warned women artists that, generally speaking, the job makes it extremely difficult to juggle being married and having children in the field.

=== CGI ===
Neill has made several comments on the benefit of using CGI to enhance the makeups created by artists. "CGI is a helpful tool, but will never be the sole method in the field."

== Positions ==
Neill served as a judge on the Syfy original series Face Off which features makeup artists competing for $100,000.

In 2017, Neill accepted the position of Director of Education at Cinema Makeup School in Los Angeles, California.

In 2021, Neill started her own school, Legends Makeup Academy in Los Angeles, California.

Neill has worked on all of the films of the Pirates of the Caribbean franchise. Other notable films she has worked on are Austin Powers in Goldmember, The Hunger Games, The Hunger Games: Catching Fire, A.I. Artificial Intelligence, Hook, and Edward Scissorhands.

== Awards and nominations ==
=== Academy Award (Oscar) ===
==== Wins ====
- Beetlejuice
- Mrs. Doubtfire
- Ed Wood

==== Nominations ====
- Edward Scissorhands
- Batman Returns
- Hoffa
- Pirates of the Caribbean: The Curse of the Black Pearl
- Pirates of the Caribbean: At World's End

=== Emmy Award ===
- The Shining

=== Daytime Emmy Award ===
- Pee-wee's Playhouse

=== Saturn Award ===
- Beetlejuice
- Batman Returns
- Ed Wood
- Pirates of the Caribbean: At World's End
