= McKenzie Westmore =

American actress (born 1977)

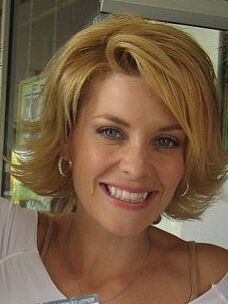
- Westmore in April 2005
- Born: McKenzie Kate Westmore; April 26, 1977 (age 49); San Fernando, California, U.S.
- Education: Los Angeles County High School for the Arts
- Occupations: Actress; singer; host; entrepreneur; model
- Years active: 1980–present (acting)
- Known for: Passions; Face Off; Star Trek franchise
- Spouse: Patrick Tatopoulos (m. 2015)
- Children: 1
- Parent(s): Michael Westmore; Marion Christine Bergeson
- Relatives: See Westmore family

McKenzie Kate Westmore (born April 26, 1977) is an American actress. She is best known for having played the role of Sheridan Crane in the television series Passions from 1999 to 2008 and for being the host of Face Off from 2011 to 2018.

== Early life ==
Westmore was born April 26, 1977, in San Fernando, California. She is part of the Westmore family, known for their achievements in film makeup. She is the daughter of makeup artists Marion Christine Bergeson and Michael Westmore. She attended the Los Angeles County High School for the Arts as a music major and graduated in 1995.

== Career ==
Westmore made her acting debut at three years of age in the 1980 film Raging Bull as the daughter of Robert De Niro's character. She is best known for playing Sheridan Crane in the television soap opera Passions from 1999 to 2008. From 2011 to 2018, Westmore served as the host of the Syfy television series Face Off, a reality competition show featuring makeup artists competing for $100,000.

Westmore has appeared in multiple pieces of Star Trek media, including Star Trek: The Next Generation, Star Trek: Deep Space Nine, Star Trek: Voyager, Star Trek: Enterprise, and Star Trek: Insurrection.

== Personal life ==
McKenzie Westmore was married to Seven Volpone from 2002 to 2011. Their divorce was finalized in 2012. Their son Maddox was born in 2006.

On October 11, 2015, Westmore married former Face Off judge Patrick Tatopoulos. The couple met while working together on the first season of the show. The wedding ceremony was held at Chateau Le Dome at Saddlerock Ranch Winery in Malibu, California. Westmore has a pet Italian Greyhound.

In 2019, Westmore revealed that she has Tourette syndrome, having been diagnosed with the genetic condition at age 10.

McKenzie Westmore is the founder and creative director of Westmore Beauty, a cosmetics brand.

== Filmography ==
Film roles
Year	Title	Role	Notes	Refs.
1980	Raging Bull	Jake's daughter	Uncredited	
1998	Star Trek: Insurrection	Ba'ku woman		
2011	Vile	Diane		
2013	Dose of Reality	Show producer		
2018	Unbelievable!!!!!	Award show co-host		
2019	Goodbye Dessa	Kathryn	Short film	

Television roles
Year	Title	Role	Notes	Refs.
1988	Star Trek: The Next Generation	Rose	Episode: "When the Bough Breaks"	
1996	Weird Science	Jessica	Episode: "Pirates!"	
1999	Star Trek: Voyager	Ensign Jenkins	Episode: "Warhead"	
1999–2008	Passions	Sheridan Crane	1730 episodes	
2001	Friends	Presenter	Episode: "The One with Joey's Award"	
2002	Weakest Link	Herself	Episode: "Daytime Stars"	
2003	Miss Match	Abby Connor	Episode: "Forgive and Forget"	
2008–2009	All My Children	Dr. Riley Sinclair	25 episodes	
2009	Surviving Suburbia	Vicki	Episode: "Burn Bougainvillea, Burn"	
2011–2018	Face Off	Herself (hostess)	150 episodes	
2017	Face Off: Game Face	Herself (hostess)	4 episodes	
2018	The Bay	Caroline Allen	Episodes: "Deliver Us" and "Unlawful"	
2018	AKC National Championship	Herself	Served as the representative for the hound group.	
2020	Star Trek: Picard	Commander Rhomsew	Episode: "Maps and Legends" (uncredited)	
2025	Love In The Clouds	Brooklyn	Hallmark movie	
2025	Disaster Strike Force	Molly Martin	CW	
