= Michael Westmore =

American make-up artist (born 1938)

- Born: March 22, 1938 (age 88); Los Angeles, California, U.S.
- Education: University of California-Santa Barbara
- Occupation: Make-up artist
- Years active: 1961–2005
- Known for: Star Trek: The Next Generation, Deep Space Nine, Voyager, Enterprise, Indian, and Dasavathaaram
- Children: 3, including McKenzie and Michael II
- Father: Monte Westmore
- Relatives: Westmore family
- Awards: 1985 Academy Award for Make-up; 9x Emmy Awards

Michael George Westmore (born March 22, 1938) is an American make-up artist best known for his work in various Star Trek productions, winning nine Emmy Awards, and is a member of the Westmore family. He won the Academy Award for Make-up in 1985 for his work on the film Mask. His career began at Universal Studios in 1961, and spanned four decades, including working for the CIA creating make-up kits for spies overseas.

== Biography ==
Born in Los Angeles, California, Westmore is the son of Monte Westmore, husband of model Marion Bergeson Westmore, father of McKenzie Westmore, Michele Westmore Meeks, and Michael Westmore II, and brother of Marvin Westmore, and Monty Westmore, who are also make-up artists. His family is heavily involved in the Hollywood make-up business. In 1917, his grandfather George Westmore had created the first studio make-up department. Michael's father was a make-up artist for Gone with the Wind and his uncles were Bud Westmore, famous for co-creating the creature in Creature from the Black Lagoon, Perc (main make-up artist at the Warner Brothers studio), Wally (Paramount), Ern, and Frank, all make-up artists working regularly in major Hollywood productions for decades.

He is a 1961 graduate of the University of California-Santa Barbara and a member of Lambda Chi Alpha fraternity. He began working for Universal Studios in 1961 as a make-up artist, and was promoted after three years to Assistant Department Head of Make-Up. He apprenticed to John Chambers on the 1963 film The List of Adrian Messenger. Some of Westmore's earliest roles at Universal included The Munsters and Land of the Lost. He became a freelance make-up artist during the 1970s and 80s, working on films such as Rocky and Raging Bull. For Raging Bull, Westmore designed the prosthetic noses which Robert De Niro wore throughout the film, and the make up which simulated bleeding through tubes placed under fake skin. One of the more unusual effects used on the boxing film was a special effect which showed a nose breaking from a punch on screen. He worked with Tom Burman on make-up sets for the Central Intelligence Agency for operatives overseas to change identities. A set created by the pair sold for $20,000 in 2011.

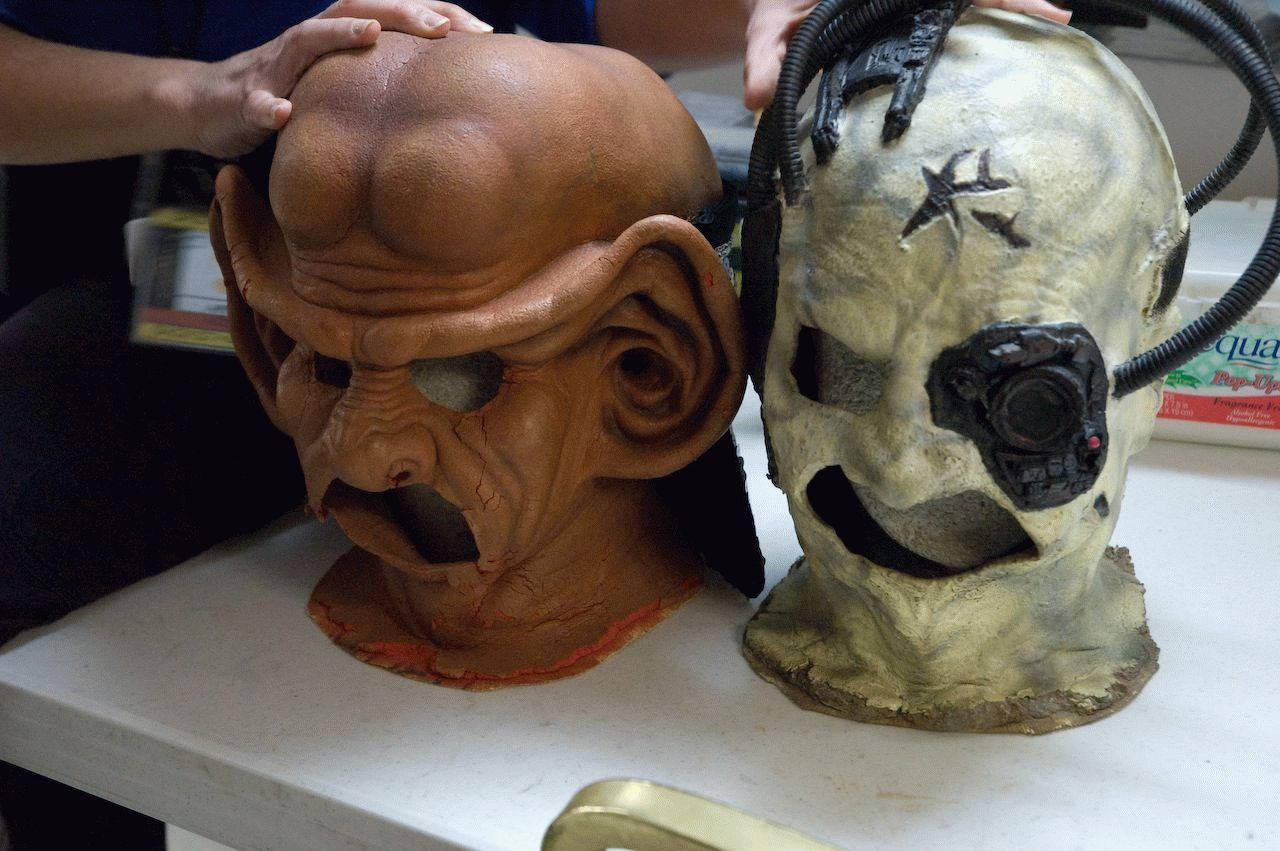
The Ferengi (left) and Borg (right) designs, both developed by Westmore for Star Trek: The Next Generation

In 1985, he appeared in a video released on VHS called Looking Your Best with Michael Westmore. He was hired in 1986 to work on Star Trek: The Next Generation, and would go on to work on Deep Space Nine, Voyager and Enterprise. He was initially apprehensive about working on a television show as his previous experience had been only with feature films, but after discussing it with his wife he thought that the idea of a year-long project was positive. During his time on the shows he developed the make-up for several alien races, including the Ferengi, Cardassians, Jem'Hadar, and further developed the make-up used on Klingon characters. One of his first roles was the development of the make-up used on Brent Spiner to create the character Data. He left the Star Trek franchise in 2005, following the cancellation of Enterprise.

Following Star Trek, he went into semi-retirement and worked on the musical version of Mask, having previously worked on the movie version. He has begun work as a producer and aims to write a two-volume autobiography. He also made a guest appearance on the third series finale of reality TV make-up show Face Off, alongside his daughter McKenzie Westmore who is the presenter of the show. After that, he has appeared in subsequent seasons as a mentor to the contestants of the show.

== Indian Films ==
Westmore introduction to Indian Cinema was through 1985 Tamil film Oru Kaidhiyin Diary for Kamal Haasan's elderly man character David - biological father of the protagonist. He was also responsible for Kamal Haasan's make up in the S. Shankar directed Indian Tamil film called Indian. He also did an elderly women makeup for Kamal Hassan in a Tamil film Avvai Shanmugi. He also spent eighteen months on the Indian film Dasavathaaram, where actor Kamal Haasan played ten different roles which each required prosthetics.

== Awards ==
Westmore won an Academy Award for Makeup for the 1985 Cher film Mask, and has been nominated three other times, for 2010: The Year We Make Contact (1984), The Clan of the Cave Bear (1986) and Star Trek: First Contact (1996). He has won nine Emmy Awards, and was nominated for at least one Emmy every year from 1984 to 2005 (as well as from 1976 to 1978). He has also suggested that he may be indirectly responsible for the addition of a make-up award at the Oscars as he was put forward for a special Oscar in 1980 for his work on Raging Bull, and after it was turned down there was such a reaction that a proper award was instituted during the following year. Westmore won a Tamil Nadu State Film Awards for Makeup for the 2008 Tamil-language film Dasavathaaram.

== Published works ==
- Westmore, Michael G. (1973). The Art of Theatrical Makeup for Stage and Screen. New York: McGraw-Hill. ISBN 9780070694859.
- Westmore, Michael G.; Nazzaro, Joe (1993). The Official Star Trek: The Next Generation FX Journal. New York: Starlog Communications. ISBN 9780070694859.
- Westmore, Michael G. (2000). Star Trek Aliens and Artifacts. New York: Pocket Books. ISBN 9780671042998.
