= List of burials at Forest Lawn Memorial Park (Glendale) =

Burials at Forest Lawn Memorial Park

This is a list of notable people buried at the Forest Lawn Memorial Park cemetery in Glendale, California. The cemetery was founded in 1906 and has been used for many funerals of film stars and other celebrities since then.

(Those in non-public areas are marked NP.)

== A ==
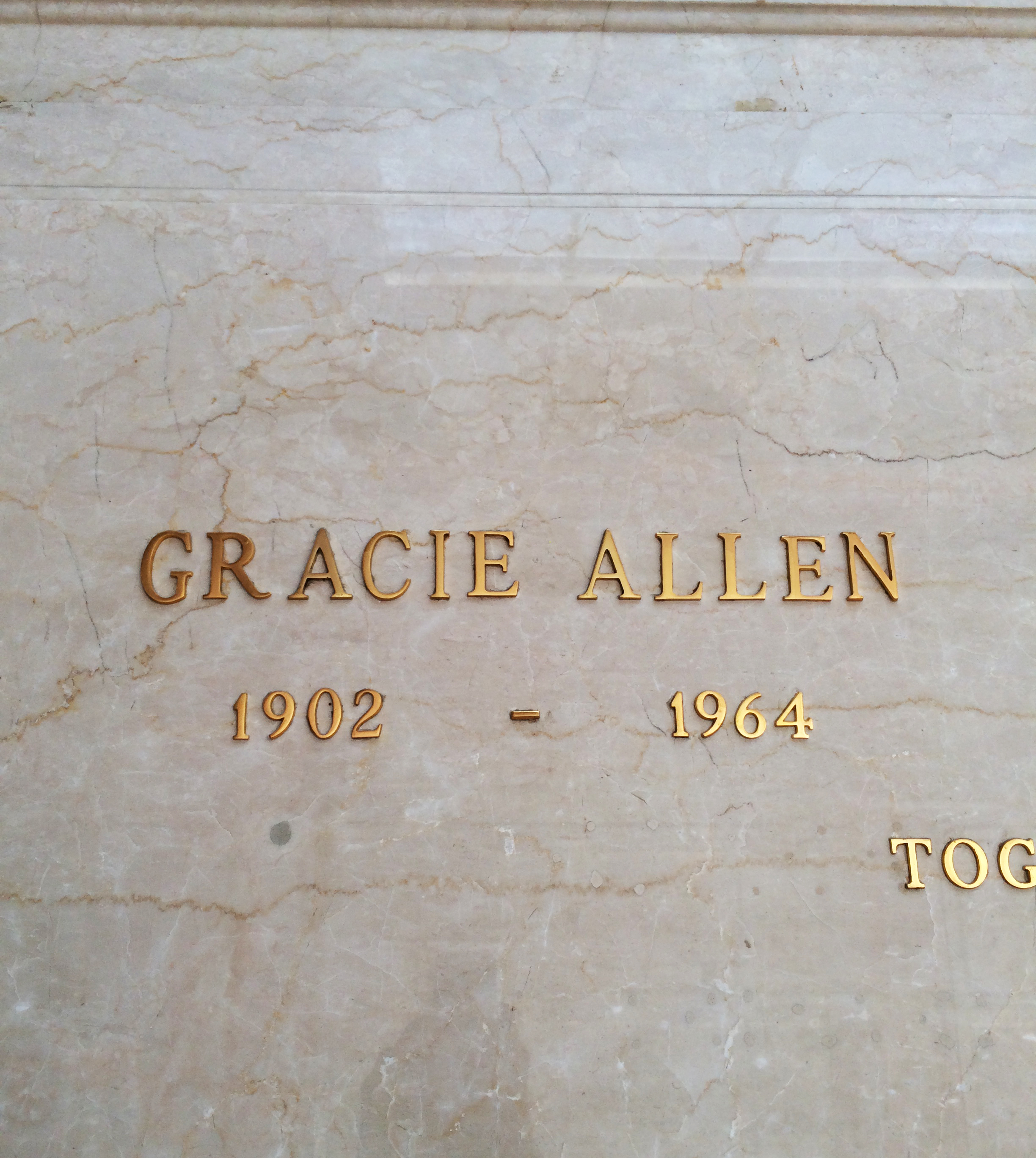
Crypt of Gracie Allen

- John Aasen (1890–1938), silent movie giant
- Forrest J Ackerman (1916–2008), science fiction, horror, pop culture historian and writer and editor of Famous Monsters of Filmland magazine
- Art Acord (1890–1931), actor
- Anita Louise Adler (1915–1970), actress, wife of producer Buddy Adler
- Maurice "Buddy" Adler (1909–1960), producer, husband of actress Anita Louise
- Donald Addrisi (1938–1984), singer, one-half of the Addrisi Brothers singing-songwriting duo
- John G. Adolfi (1888–1933), director, actor and screenwriter of Warner Bros. films
- Caroline Leonetti Ahmanson (1918–2005), businesswoman, philanthropist, wife of Howard F. Ahmanson Sr.
- Howard F. Ahmanson Sr. (1906–1968), financier, philanthropist
- Leonora Ainsworth (1871-1939), screenwriter in silent era
- Wally Albright (1925–1999), child actor, Wally in the Our Gang short subjects
- Robert Alda (1914–1986), actor and singer, father of actors Alan and Antony Alda
- Richard Alexander (1902–1989), actor
- Ross Alexander (1907–1937), actor
- Britt Allcroft (1943–2024), screenwriter, producer, director, voice actress
- Duane Allen (1937–2003), NFL player
- Gracie Allen (1895–1964), actress and comedian, wife of George Burns
- Fred Lind Alles (1851–1945), businessman and civic leader, secretary for the National Irrigation Congress
- Elvia Allman (1904–1992), actress and voice actress
- Wayne Allwine (1947–2009), voice actor, sound effects editor, Foley artist, 3rd voice of Mickey Mouse
- Astrid Allwyn (1905–1978), actress
- June Allyson (1917–2006), actress
- Louis "Two Gun" Alterie (1886–1935), gangster (unmarked grave)
- Lona Andre (1915–1992), actress
- NP LaVerne Andrews (1911–1967), singer
- NP Maxene Andrews (1916–1995), singer
- Lucien Andriot (1892–1979), cinematographer
- George Aratani (1917–2013), businessman and philanthropist
- George Archainbaud (1890–1959), director, producer
- NP James Arness (1923–2011), actor
- Isaac Colton Ash (1861–1933), Los Angeles City Council member 1925–27
- Frederic M. Ashley (1870–1960), architect
- Roscoe Ates (1895–1962), actor and comedian
- Gene Austin (1900–1972), singer
- Marion Aye (1903–1951), silent film actress
- Mitchell Ayres (1909–1969), musician

== B ==
Crypt marker of Rex Bell and Clara Bow

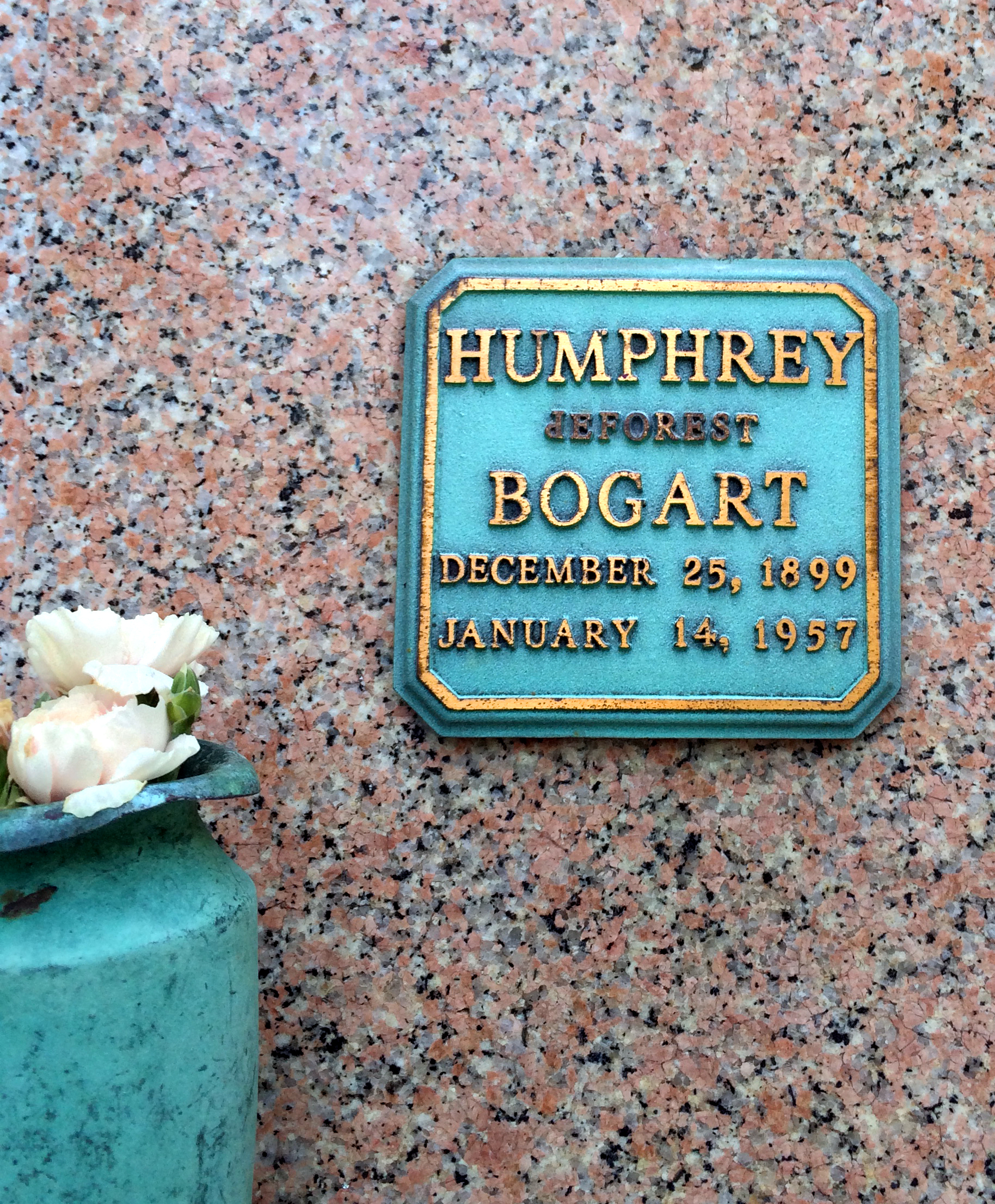
Niche marker of Humphrey Bogart

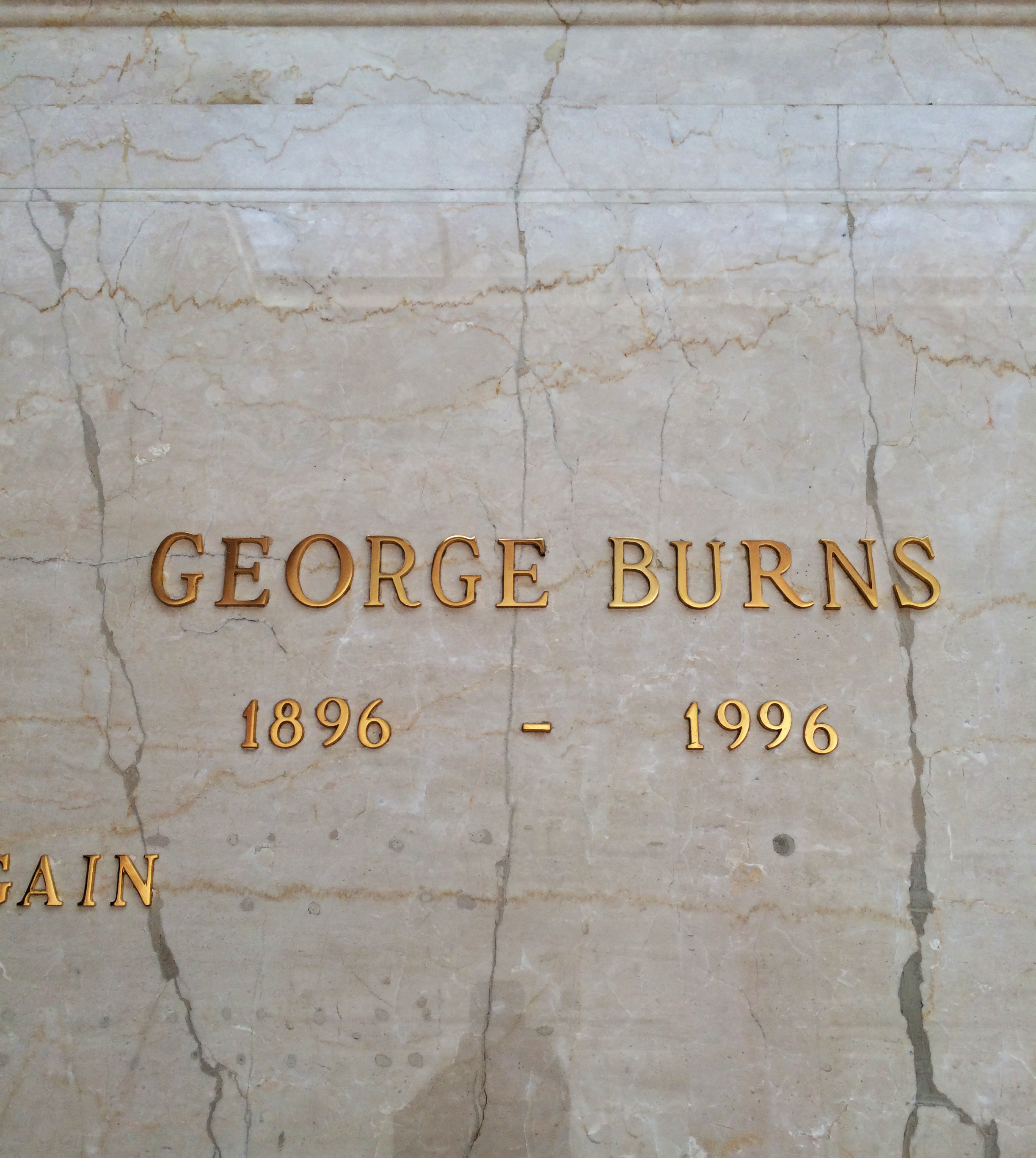
Crypt of George Burns

- Fay Babcock (1895–1970), set decorator
- NP Lauren Bacall (1924–2014), actress
- Constantin Bakaleinikoff (1896–1966), composer/conductor, younger brother of Mischa Bakaleinikoff
- Mischa Bakaleinikoff (1890–1960), composer/conductor, older brother of Constantin Bakaleinikoff
- Art Baker (1898–1966), actor
- Suzan Ball (1934–1955), actress
- Travis Banton (1894–1958), costume designer
- NP Theda Bara (1885–1955), actress
- Marie Louise Bottineau Baldwin (1863–1952), (Metis/Turtle Mountain Chippewa) lawyer, civil servant and suffragist.
- NP Joseph Barbera (1911–2006), animator and co-founder/namesake of Hanna-Barbera
- Joan Barclay (1914–2002), actress
- Ben Bard (1893–1974), actor, husband of actress Ruth Roland (unmarked grave)
- Binnie Barnes (1903–1998), actress, wife of M.J. Frankovich
- George Barris (1925–2015), designer and builder of various Hollywood custom cars
- Jack Barry (1918–1984), television host and producer
- Billy Barty (1924–2000), actor
- Florence Bates (1888–1954), actress
- Norman F. Bates (1839–1915), Medal of Honor recipient
- Frank Joslyn Baum (1883–1958), film producer, son of L. Frank and Maud Gage Baum
- Harry Neal Baum (1889–1967), author, son of L. Frank and Maud Gage Baum
- L. Frank Baum (1856–1919), author of The Wonderful Wizard of Oz
- Maud Gage Baum (1861–1953), widow of L. Frank Baum
- Warner Baxter (1889–1951), actor
- Harry Beaumont (1888–1966), director, actor, screenwriter
- John C. Becher (1915–1986), actor
- Robert "Iceberg Slim" Beck (1918–1992), pimp turned best-selling author
- Claud Beelman (1883–1963), architect
- Wallace Beery (1885–1949), actor
- Alphonzo E. Bell Jr. (1914–2004), U.S. Representative from California
- Rex Bell (1903–1962), actor and Nevada lieutenant governor, husband of actress Clara Bow
- Madge Bellamy (1899–1990), actress
- Cosmo Kyrle Bellew (1883–1948), actor
- Elsie Lincoln Benedict (1885–1970), author and lecturer
- Henry S. Benedict (1878–1930), U.S. Representative from California
- William Benedict (1917–1999), actor
- Enid Bennett (1893–1969), actress, wife of Fred Niblo and Sidney Franklin
- Marjorie Bennett (1896–1982), actress
- Harry Beresford (1863–1944), actor
- George Bergstrom (1876–1955), architect
- Felix Bernard (1897–1944), songwriter
- Curtis Bernhardt (1899–1981), director
- Joe Besser (1907–1988), actor and comedian (The Three Stooges)
- Claude Binyon (1905–1978), screenwriter and director
- Billie Bird (1908–2002), actress
- Julie Bishop (1914–2001), actress
- J. Stuart Blackton (1875–1941), founder of Vitagraph Studios
- Olive Blakeney (1899–1959), actress
- Clara Blandick (1876–1962), actress
- Jack Bliss (1882–1968), MLB player
- Michael Blodgett (1939–2007), actor and screenwriter
- Joan Blondell (1906–1979), actress
- Eric Blore (1887–1959), actor
- Monte Blue (1887–1963), actor
- Betty Blythe (1893–1972), actress
- Eddie Bockman (1920–2011), baseball player, manager, scout
- True Boardman (1882–1918), actor
- Virginia True Boardman (1889–1971), actress
- NP Humphrey Bogart (1899–1957), actor
- Mary Boland (1882–1965), actress
- Olive Borden (1906–1947), actress
- Gutzon Borglum (1865–1941), sculptor of Mount Rushmore
- Frank Borzage (1894–1962), actor, director
- Stephen Boss (1982–2022), actor and television personality
- NP Hobart Bosworth (1867–1943), actor, director, producer, and screenwriter
- Clara Bow (1905–1965), actress
- NP William Boyd (1895–1972), actor, known for playing cowboy hero Hopalong Cassidy
- NP Charles Brabin (1882–1957), British-born director and screenwriter, husband of actress Theda Bara
- Robert N. Bradbury (1886–1949), director and screenwriter, father of Bob Steele
- NP Grace Bradley (1913–2010), actress, widow of actor William Boyd
- Lenny Breau (1941–1984), musician (unmarked grave)
- Edmund Breese (1871–1936), actor
- Tom Breneman (1902–1948), radio personality, host of Breakfast in Hollywood
- Mozelle Britton (1912–1953), actress
- John Bromfield (1922–2005), actor
- Betty Bronson (1906–1971), actress
- Rand Brooks (1918–2003), actor
- Clarence Brown (1890–1987), director (unmarked grave)
- James Harvey Brown (1906–1995), Los Angeles City Council member and municipal court judge
- Joe E. Brown (1891–1973), actor and comedian
- NP Johnny Mack Brown (1904–1974), actor and athlete
- Lansing Brown Jr. (1900–1962), photographer
- Robert Brubaker (1916–2010), character actor
- Winifred Bryson (1892–1987), actress, widow of actor Warner Baxter
- Harold S. Bucquet (1891–1946), director
- Ralph Budd (1879–1962), railroad president
- Vincent Bugliosi (1934–2015), lawyer and author of true crime books
- Jon Bunch (1970–2016), rock singer-songwriter, frontman of Sense Field and Further Seems Forever
- Milo Burcham (1903–1944), test pilot
- Helen Burgess (1916–1937), actress
- William Prentiss Burke (1900-1991), photographer
- W.R. Burnett (1899–1982), novelist and screenwriter
- Dorsey Burnette (1932–1979), singer and songwriter
- Johnny Burnette (1934–1964), singer and songwriter, younger brother of Dorsey Burnette
- Bob Burns (1890–1956), actor and comedian
- George Burns (1896–1996), actor and comedian, husband of Gracie Allen
- Francis X. Bushman (1883–1966), actor
- David Butler (1894–1979), director
- Wally Byam (1896–1962), founder of Airstream, one of the pioneer manufacturers of the travel trailer
- Ralph Byrd (1909–1952), actor

== C ==
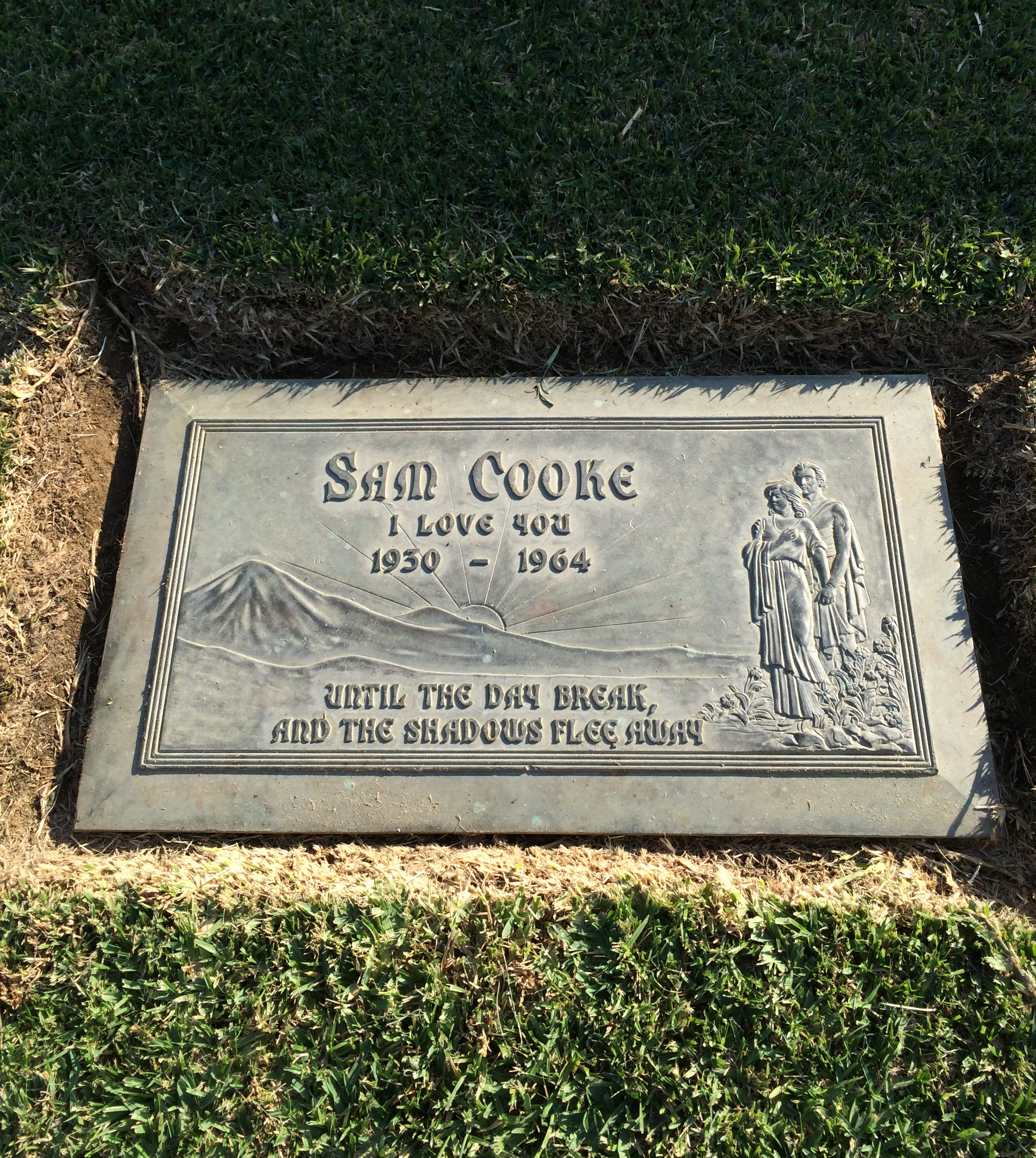
Grave of Sam Cooke

- Christy Cabanne (1888–1950), director
- Charles Wakefield Cadman (1881–1946), composer
- Alice Calhoun (1900–1966), actress
- Ransom M. Callicott (1895–1962), restaurateur and politician
- Albert Ralph Campbell (1875–1925), Marine Corps Medal of Honor recipient
- NP Judy Canova (1913–1983), actress, singer, and comedian
- Eduardo Cansino Sr. (1895–1968), dancer, father of actress Rita Hayworth
- June Caprice-Millarde (1895–1936), actress
- Ora Carew (1893–1955), actress
- Sue Carol (1906–1982), actress and talent agent, wife of Alan Ladd, step-mother of Alan Ladd Jr., mother of David Ladd
- Jeanne Carpenter (1916–1994), child actress of silent films
- Nat Carr (1886–1944), actor
- Dona Lee Carrier (1940–1961), figure skating champion
- Earl Carroll (1893–1948), theatre impresario, owner of the Earl Carroll Theatres in New York and Hollywood
- NP Jack Carson (1910–1963), Canadian-born actor, younger brother of actor Robert Carson
- NP Robert Carson (1909–1979), actor, older brother of actor Jack Carson
- Emma Carus (1879–1927), singer
- William Castle (1914–1977), film director
- Connie Cezon (1925–2004), actress
- Dolly Cepeda (1964–1977), victim of the Hillside Strangler (original grave site, moved to Forest Lawn in Cypress)
- Mario Chamlee (1892–1966), opera singer
- George Chandler (1898–1985), actor, Uncle Petrie Martin on TV's Lassie
- NP Lon Chaney (1883–1930), actor (unmarked grave)
- Charles Chapman (1853–1944), founder of Chapman University
- Spencer Charters (1875–1943), actor
- Charley Chase (1893–1940), actor and comedian
- Rex Cherryman (1896–1928), actor
- Noble "Kid" Chissell (1905–1987), boxer, actor, dance marathon champion
- Tim Choate (1954–2004), actor
- Berton Churchill (1876–1940), actor
- Frank Churchill (1901–1942), composer for Walt Disney Productions' cartoons
- George Cisar (1912–1978), actor
- Kit Clardy (1892–1961), US Representative from Michigan
- Buddy Clark (1912–1949), singer
- Carroll Clark (1894–1968), art director
- Edward Clark (1878–1954), actor, songwriter
- Jack Clark (1925–1988), actor
- Betty Ross Clarke (1892–1970), actress
- Stiles O. Clements (1883–1966), architect
- Brian Clewer (1928–2008), radio host
- Elmer Clifton (1890–1949), actor and director
- Clifford E. Clinton (1900–1969), businessman, founder and owner of Clifton's Cafeteria
- John Clum (1851–1932), Indian agent, founder of The Tombstone Epitaph newspaper and first mayor of Tombstone, AZ
- Andy Clyde (1892–1967), actor
- Joe Cobb (1916–2002), child actor in Hal Roach's Our Gang comedic film series
- Octavus Roy Cohen (1891–1959), author
- Maria Cole (1922–2012), singer, widow of Nat King Cole
- Nat King Cole (1919–1965), singer
- NP Natalie Cole (1950–2015), singer-songwriter, daughter of Nat King and Maria Cole
- Buddy Collette (1921–2010), musician (unmarked grave)
- William Collier Sr. (1864–1944), actor, filmmaker
- Russ Columbo (1908–1934), singer
- Roger Converse (1911–1994), actor
- Jack Conway (1887–1952), director, actor
- NP Sam Cooke (1931–1964), singer
- Lillian Copeland (1904–1964), athlete
- Philip Coppens (1971–2012), author
- NP Ellen Corby (1911–1999), actress
- Regis Cordic (1926–1999), actor
- Herbert Corthell (1878–1947), actor
- Don Costello (1901–1945), actor
- Edward Coxen (1880–1954), actor
- Charles H. Crawford (1879–1931), crime figure, mobster, leader of the City Hall Gang in Los Angeles
- Kathryn Crawford (1908–1980), actress
- Laird Cregar (1913–1944), actor
- Donald Crisp (1882–1974), actor and director
- George E. Cryer (1875–1961), 32nd Mayor of Los Angeles
- NP George Cukor (1899–1983), director (unmarked grave)
- Zara Cully (1892–1978), actress
- Robert Cummings (1910–1990), actor
- Lester Cuneo (1888–1925), silent film western actor
- Edward S. Curtis (1868–1952), writer/Old American west photographer/ethnologist
- Michael Curtiz (1886–1962), director

== D ==
Crypt of Dorothy Dandridge

Walt Disney's garden and crypt

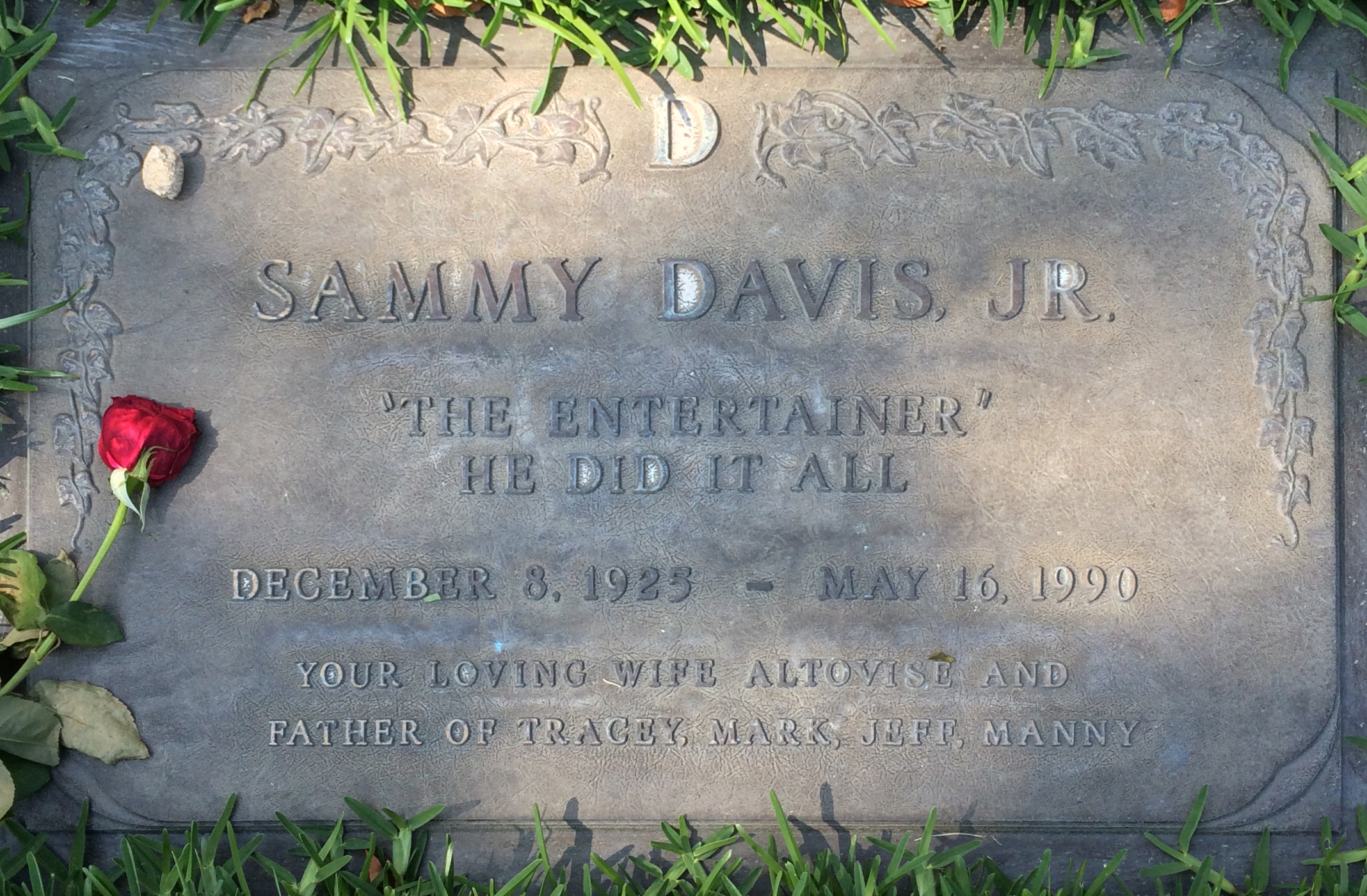
Grave of Sammy Davis Jr.

- Fifi D'Orsay (1904–1983), actress and singer
- Babe Dahlgren (1912–1996), Major League Baseball player
- Dan Dailey (1915–1978), actor, singer and dancer
- Dorothy Dandridge (1922–1965), actress and singer
- Ruby Dandridge (1900–1987), actress, mother of Dorothy Dandridge
- Mickey Daniels (1914–1970), actor, one of the original children in the Our Gang short subjects
- William H. Daniels (1900–1970), cinematographer, Garbo's cameraman
- Jane Darwell (1879–1967), actress
- Dorothy Davenport (1895–1977), actress, screenwriter, film director and producer
- Ed J. Davenport (1899–1953), Los Angeles City Council member
- Delmer Daves (1904–1977), director, screenwriter, and producer
- NP Altovise Davis (1943–2009), actress and dancer, wife of Sammy Davis Jr. (unmarked grave)
- George Davis (1914–1998), art director
- Jim Davis (1909–1981), actor, Jock Ewing on TV's Dallas
- Mildred Davis (1901–1969), actress, wife of comic actor, Harold Lloyd, mother of Harold Lloyd Jr.
- NP Sammy Davis Jr. (1925–1990), actor, singer and dancer
- NP Sammy Davis Sr. (1900–1988), dancer, father of Sammy Davis Jr.
- Jack Dawn (1892–1961), make-up artist (unmarked grave)
- Sam De Grasse (1875–1953), actor
- Julia Dean (1878–1952), actress
- Carter DeHaven (1886–1977), actor
- Flora Parker DeHaven (1883–1950), actress, wife of Carter DeHaven
- Osborn Deignan (1873–1913), Medal of Honor recipient
- Eddie DeLange (1904–1949), musician (unmarked grave)
- Georges Delerue (1925–1992), composer
- Cyril Delevanti (1889–1975), actor
- Armando del Moral (1916–2009), film journalist, helped found the Golden Globes
- Hampton Del Ruth (1875–1958), actor, director, producer, screenwriter
- Joseph De Stefani (1879–1940), actor
- Buddy DeSylva (1895–1950), songwriter, co-founder of Capitol Records
- William Demarest (1892–1983), character actor, Uncle Charley on My Three Sons
- Carol Dempster (1901–1991), actress
- Noah Dietrich (1889–1982), businessman
- Fannie Charles Dillon (1881–1947), composer, pianist
- Alan Dinehart (1889–1944), actor
- Elias Disney (1859–1941) and Flora Disney (1868–1938), parents of Walt Disney and Roy O. Disney
- Lillian Disney (1899–1997), ink artist, philanthropist, widow of Walt Disney, mother of Diane Disney Miller
- Walt Disney (1901–1966), film studio and entertainment park founder, co-creator of Mickey Mouse, Donald Duck, and Goofy, as well as the 1st voice of Mickey Mouse
- Richard Dix (1893–1949), actor
- George Dolenz (1908–1963), actor, star of The Count of Monte Cristo, father of The Monkees' Micky Dolenz, grandfather of Ami Dolenz
- Jenny Dolly (1892–1941), entertainer, twin sister of Rosie Dolly
- Rosie Dolly (1892–1970), entertainer, twin sister of Jenny Dolly
- Don Douglas (1905–1945), actor
- Gordon Douglas (1907–1993), child actor turned director
- Lloyd C. Douglas (1877–1951), novelist
- Billie Dove (1903–1997), actress
- William C. Dowlan (1882–1947), actor and director
- Maxine Doyle (1915–1973), actress
- Theodore Dreiser (1871–1945), novelist
- Chuck Dressen (1894–1966), MLB baseball player, coach and manager
- Louise Dresser (1878–1965), actress
- NP Marie Dressler (1868–1934), Canadian-born actress and comedian
- NP Don Drysdale (1936–1993), MLB baseball player for the Los Angeles Dodgers (ashes later scattered in 2003)
- David Dukes (1945–2000), actor
- Rosetta Duncan (1894–1959), entertainer
- Vivian Duncan (1897–1986), entertainer
- Scott R. Dunlap (1892–1970), director, producer, screenwriter, actor
- Cliff Durant (1890-1937), race car driver, son of the founder of General Motors, William Durant
- Glenn S. Dumke (1917–1989), educator, chancellor of California State University system (1962–1982)
- Minta Durfee (1889–1975), actress
- Marion Howard Dunham (1842–1921), teacher, activist, suffragist
- Junior Durkin (1915–1935), actor

== E ==
- Hubert Eaton (1881–1966), founder and managing director of Forest Lawn cemeteries
- Jay Eaton (1899–1970), character actor
- Mary Eaton (1901–1948), actress
- Neely Edwards (1883–1965), actor and comedian (unmarked grave)
- Ralph Edwards (1913–2005), television and radio host
- Arnold Ehret (1866–1922), health educator and author of diet books
- Sally Eilers (1908–1978), actress
- Charles Irving Elliott (1892–1972), aviation pioneer
- Dick Elliott (1886–1961), character actor
- Connie Emerald (1892–1959), English stage actress, mother of Ida Lupino
- Fern Emmett (1896–1946), actress, wife of Henry Roquemore
- Francis de Erdely (1904–1959), painter
- Julian Eltinge (1881–1941), actor and female impersonator
- Ray Enright (1896–1965), director
- Leon Errol (1881–1951), actor and comedian
- Estelle Etterre (1899–1996), actress
- William E. Evans (1877–1959), U.S. Congressman
- Jason Evers (1922–2005), actor

== F ==
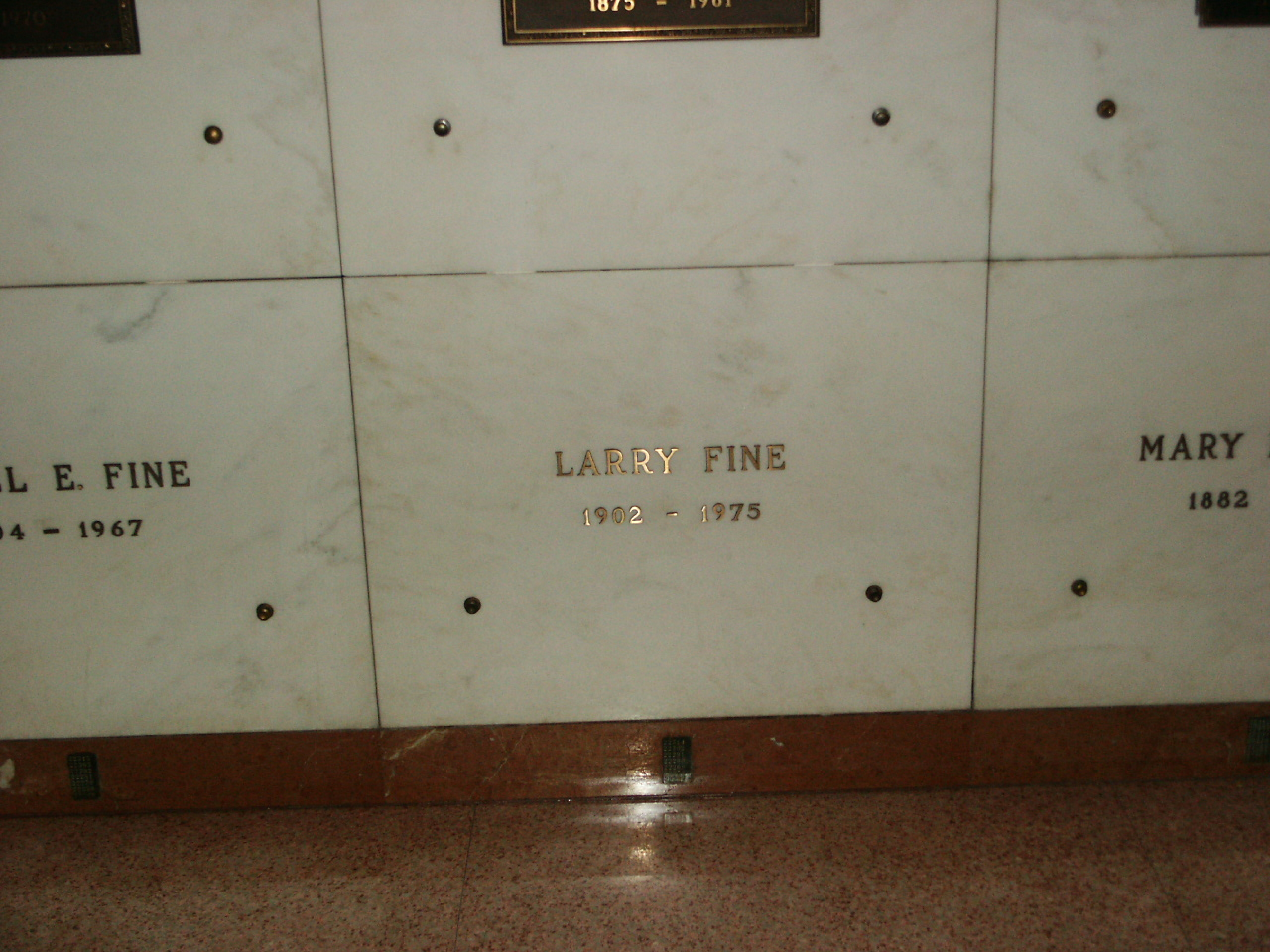
Crypt of Larry Fine

Grave of Errol Flynn

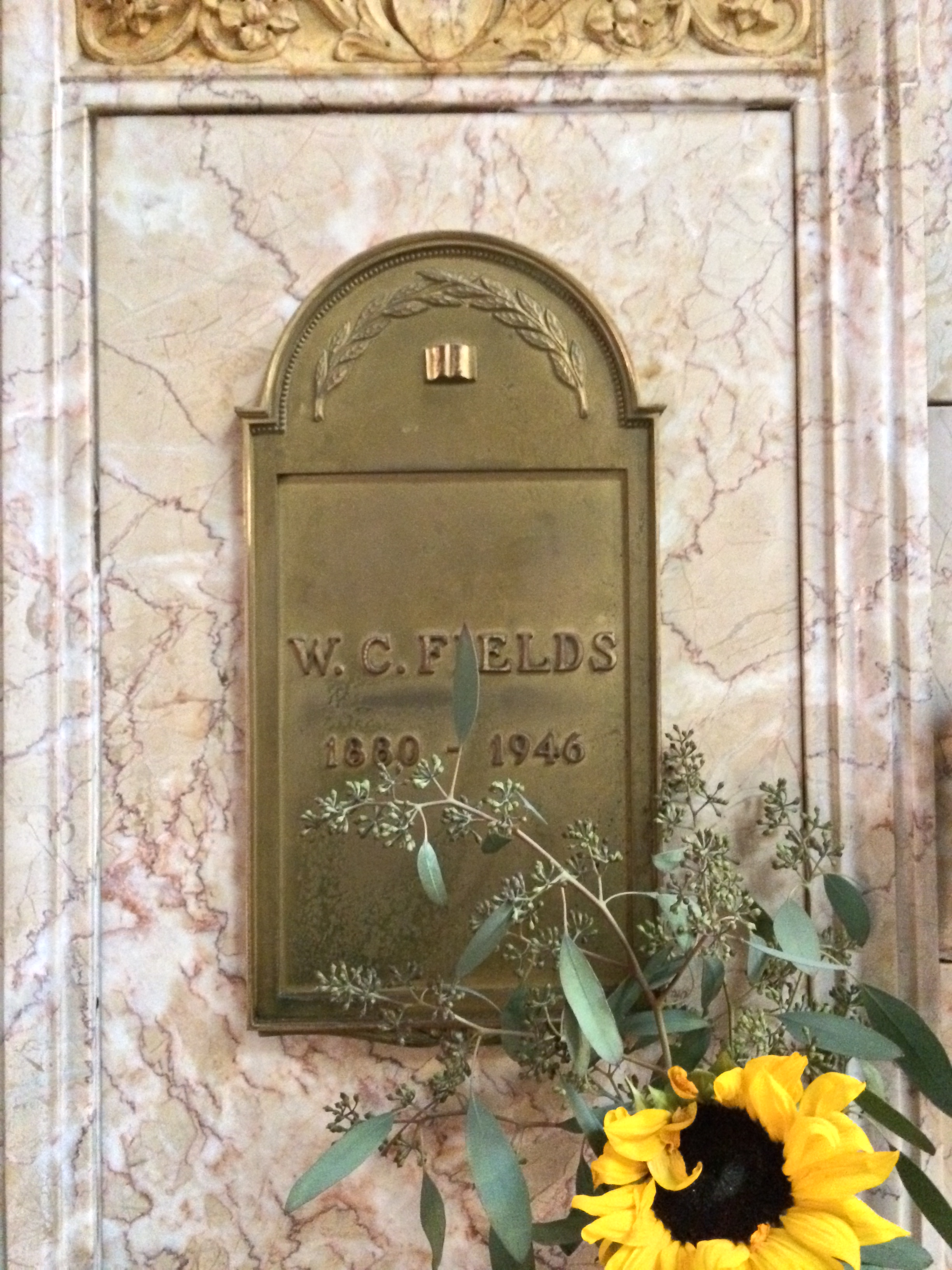
Crypt of W.C. Fields

- Douglas Fairbanks (1883–1939), actor (relocated to Hollywood Forever Cemetery in 1941)
- Dot Farley (1881–1971), actress
- Joseph W. Farnham (1884–1931), screenwriter and film editor
- William Farnum (1876–1953), actor
- Patricia Farr (1913–1948), actress
- Oda Faulconer (1884–1943), lawyer and judge and president of the Bank of Italy, San Fernando, and West Adams State Bank, Los Angeles
- Don Fedderson (1913–1994), TV writer, producer, creator of the sitcoms My Three Sons and Family Affair
- Al Ferguson (1888–1971), actor
- Helen Ferguson (1901–1977), actress
- Romaine Fielding (1867–1927), actor and director
- NP W. C. Fields (1880–1946), actor and comedian
- Larry Fine (1902–1975), actor, comedian and musician (The Three Stooges)
- Margarita Fischer (1886–1975), actress
- Robert Fiske (1889–1944), actor
- George Fitzmaurice (1885–1940), director
- Johnny Flamingo (1934–2000), blues singer
- Frank P. Flint (1862–1929), politician
- Errol Flynn (1909–1959), actor
- Tony Fontane (1925–1974), singer
- Charles E. Ford (1899–1942), director, producer
- Harrison Ford (1884–1957), silent film actor
- Helen Ford (1894–1982), actress
- John Anson Ford (1883–1983), Los Angeles County supervisor, namesake of John Anson Ford Amphitheatre
- Thomas Francis Ford (1873–1958), U.S. Congressman and Los Angeles City Council member
- Lewis R. Foster (1898–1974), director, producer, screenwriter and composer
- Ivor Francis (1918–1986), actor
- Betty Francisco (1900–1950), actress
- Bruno Frank (1887–1945), novelist and screenwriter
- Chester Franklin (1889–1954), actor, director, older brother of director-producer Sidney Franklin
- M. J. Frankovich (1909–1992), producer and athlete, adopted son of Joe E. Brown
- Nell Franse (1889–1973), actress
- Robert Frazer (1891–1944), actor
- John D. Fredericks (1869–1945), U.S. Congressman
- Charles K. French (1860–1952), actor
- George B. French (1883–1961), actor
- Rudolf Friml (1879–1972), composer
- Dwight Frye (1899–1943), actor
- Charles E. Fuller (1887–1968), evangelist
- Jules Furthman (1888–1966), screenwriter

== G ==
Sid Grauman's alcove in the Great Mausoleum

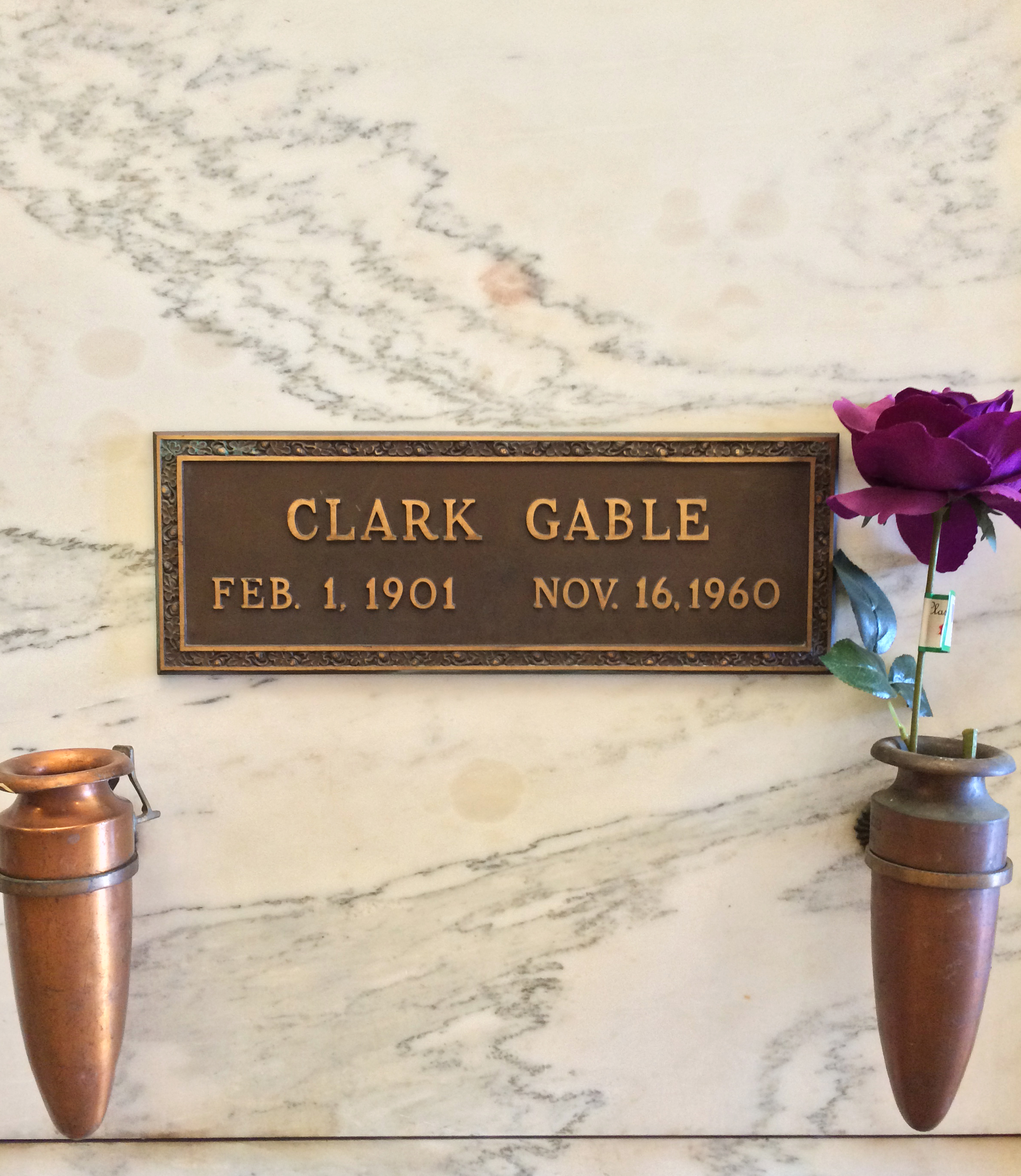
Crypt of Clark Gable

- NP Clark Gable (1901–1960), actor
- Jacqueline Gadsden (1900–1986), actress
- Danny Gans (1956–2009), singer, actor, comedian, impressionist
- Allen Garfield (1939–2020), actor
- Martin Garralaga (1894–1981), actor
- Mitzi Gaynor (1931–2024), actress
- Bud Geary (1898–1946), actor
- Herb Geller (1928–2013), saxophonist
- Rose A. George (1946–2010), First Lady of Rivers State, Nigeria
- George Getty (1855–1930), businessman and lawyer
- Jerry Giesler (1886–1962), criminal defense lawyer
- John Gilbert (1899–1936), actor
- Sandra Giles (1932–2016), actress
- A. Arnold Gillespie (1899–1978), special effects artist
- King C. Gillette (1855–1932), businessman, founder of Gillette shaving company
- Tom Gilson (1934–1962), actor
- NP Hermione Gingold (1897–1987), actress
- J. Frank Glendon (1886–1937), actor
- Peter Godfrey (1899–1970), actor and director
- Renee Godfrey (1919–1964), actress and singer, wife of Peter Godfrey
- NP Frances Goldwyn (1903–1976), actress, wife of Samuel Goldwyn (unmarked grave)
- NP Samuel Goldwyn (1879–1974), producer and mogul (unmarked grave)
- Edgar J. Goodspeed (1871–1962), theologian
- Huntley Gordon (1887–1956), actor
- NP Jetta Goudal (1891–1985), actress
- Edmund Goulding (1891–1959), director and writer
- Joe Grant (1908–2005), animator and writer
- Charles Grapewin (1869–1956), actor
- NP Sid Grauman (1879–1950), theater impresario, founder of the Million Dollar Theater, Grauman's Egyptian Theatre and Grauman's Chinese Theatre
- Gary Gray (1936–2006), actor
- Alfred E. Green (1889–1960), director
- Burton E. Green (1868–1965), oilman, real-estate developer, co-founder of Beverly Hills, California.
- Harrison Greene (1884–1945), actor
- NP Sydney Greenstreet (1879–1954), English actor
- NP Harold Grieve (1901–1993), art director, husband of Jetta Goudal
- Bessie Griffin (1922–1989), singer
- Edward H. Griffith (1888–1975), director, producer and screenwriter
- Raymond Griffith (1895–1957), actor and comedian
- Robert E. Gross (1897–1961), CEO and Chairman of the Lockheed Corporation
- Paul A. Guilfoyle (1902–1961), actor
- Fred L. Guiol (1898–1964), director and screenwriter

== H ==
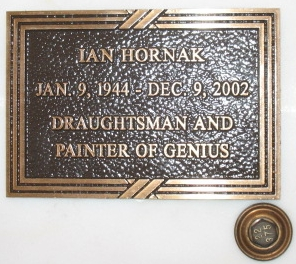
Ian Hornak's tablet in the Great Mausoleum

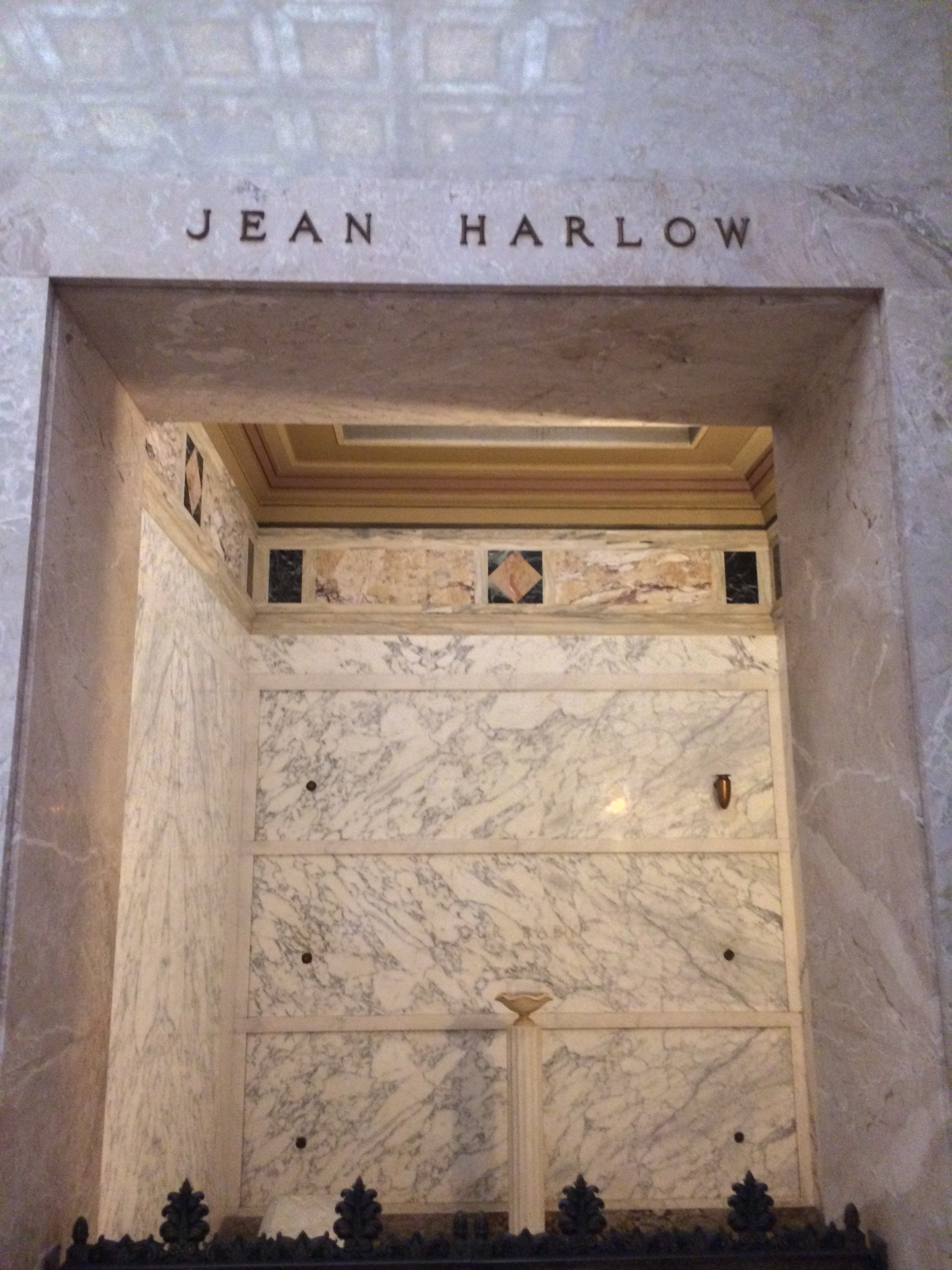
Tomb of Jean Harlow

- Frank Hagney (1884–1973), actor
- Alan Hale Sr. (1892–1950), actor
- Ella Hall (1896–1981), actress
- Ellen Hall (1923–1999), actress
- Charlie Hall (1899–1959), actor
- Philip Baker Hall (1931–2022), actor
- Ernest Haller (1896–1970), cinematographer
- Kay Hammond (1901–1982), actress
- Lula Mae Hardaway (1930–2006), songwriter, mother of musician, Stevie Wonder
- Russell Harlan (1903–1974), cinematographer
- NP Jean Harlow (1911–1937), actress
- Rex Harrison (1908–1990), actor (ashes scattered on wife Lilli Palmer's grave)
- Elizabeth Harrower (1918–2003), actress and screenwriter
- Charles Hatfield (1875–1958), scientist
- Harry Hayden (1882–1955), actor
- Edith Head (1897–1981), costume designer
- NP Charlotte Hennessy (1873–1928), Canadian actress, mother of actors Mary, Lottie and Jack Pickford
- Ralph Hepburn (1896–1948), race car driver
- Holmes Herbert (1882–1956), actor
- Babe Herman (1903–1987), baseball player
- Jean Hersholt (1886–1956), actor and humanitarian
- Louis Jean Heydt (1903–1960), actor
- Ruth Hiatt (1906–1994), actress
- Winston Hibler (1910–1976), Disney narrator, screenwriter, producer, director
- Alfred Hickman (1873–1931), English actor, husband of Nance O'Neil
- Walter Hiers (1893–1933), actor
- NP Thelma Hill (1906–1938), actress and comedian
- Józef Hofmann (1876–1957), concert pianist and inventor
- Fay Holden (1893–1973), actress
- Charles A. Holland (1872–1940), Los Angeles City Council member 1929–31
- Alice Hollister (1886–1973), actress
- George Hollister (1873–1952), cinematographer
- Bill Holman (1927–2024), jazz musician, composer
- Burton Holmes (1870–1958), director and producer, pioneered travel films
- Helen Holmes (1892–1950), actress
- Bob Holt (1928–1985), voice actor
- Gloria Hope (1901–1976), actress, wife of Lloyd Hughes
- NP Ian Hornak (1944–2002), artist
- James W. Horne (1881–1942), actor and director
- Victoria Horne (1911–2003), actress, widow of Jack Oakie
- Edward Everett Horton (1886–1970), character actor, voice actor
- William K. Howard (1899–1954), director
- Adele C. Howells (1886–1951), leader in the Church of Jesus Christ of Latter-day Saints
- Jobyna Howland (1897–1958), actress
- Lloyd Hughes (1897–1958), actor, husband of Gloria Hope
- Rupert Hughes (1872–1956), filmmaker
- Cyril Hume (1900–1966), screenwriter
- Maud Humphrey (1868–1940), suffragette, commercial illustrator, mother of Humphrey Bogart
- Marlin Hurt (1905–1948), actor and comedian
- June Hutton (1919–1973), actress and singer
- Martha Hyer (1924–2014), actress, widow of Hal B. Wallis

== I ==
- Wiard Ihnen (1897–1979), art director and production designer, husband of costume designer, Edith Head
- Rex Ingram (1892–1950), Irish director
- George Irving (1874–1961), actor

== J ==
- NP Joe Jackson (1928–2018), talent manager, Jackson family patriarch, father of Michael Jackson

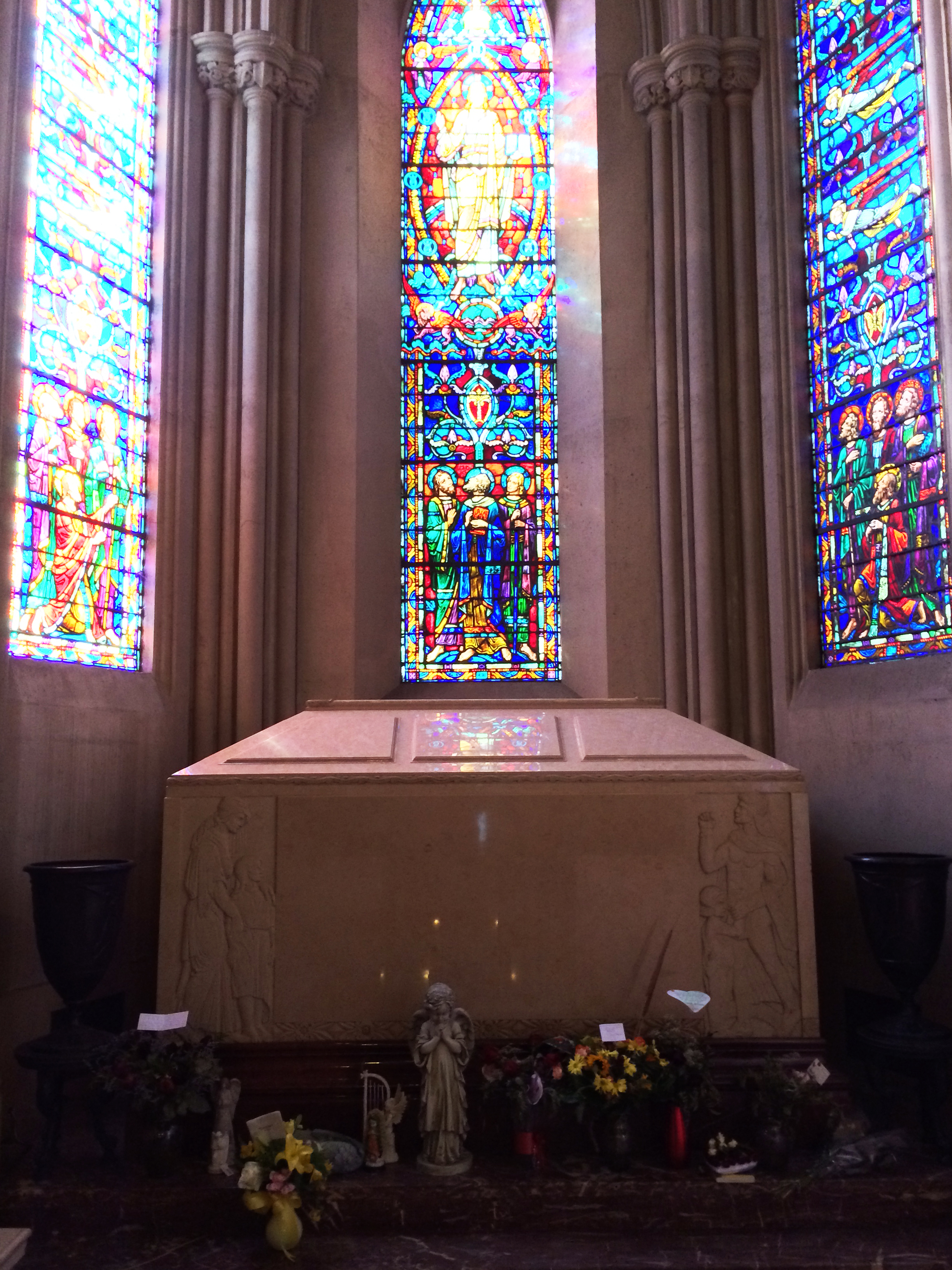
Crypt of Michael Jackson

- NP Michael Jackson (1958–2009), entertainer, singer, songwriter, record producer, dancer
- Michael Jackson (1934–2022), talk radio host
- Carrie Jacobs-Bond (1862–1946), singer and songwriter known for songs such as A Perfect Day, I Love You Truly and Just Awearyin' for You
- Elsie Janis (1889–1956), actress
- DeWitt Jennings (1871–1937), actor
- Adela Rogers St. Johns (1894–1988), journalist, screenwriter, novelist
- Emory Johnson (1894–1960), director, actor
- Arthur Johnston (1898–1954), composer
- Caro Jones (1923–2009), casting director
- F. Richard Jones (1893–1930), director, producer, husband of costume designer Irene Lentz
- Isham Jones (1894–1956), bandleader, songwriter
- George Johnson (1898–1961), voice actor, voice of Goofy (1939–1943)
- NP Jennifer Jones (1919–2009), actress, wife of actor Robert Walker, producer David O. Selznick and industrialist Norton Simon
- Rupert Julian (1879–1943), director
- Ray June (1895–1958), cinematographer
- Helmi Juvonen (1903–1985), artist plus

== K ==
- Gus Kahn (1886–1941), songwriter
- Bert Kalmar (1884–1947), songwriter
- Terry Kath (1946–1978), musician, guitarist, baritone-voiced singer-songwriter of Chicago
- Kelly Keen (1978–1981), only known fatality of a coyote attack in the United States
- Tom Keene (1896–1963), actor
- William Keighley (1889–1984), director
- Roy Kellino (1912–1956), child actor turned cinematographer-director, husband of actress/writer Pamela Mason
- John L. Kennedy (1854–1946), politician, Congressman from Nebraska's 2nd district
- A. Atwater Kent (1873–1949), businessman, radio manufacturer, invented the ignition coil
- Erle C. Kenton (1896–1980), actor and director
- Doris Kenyon (1897–1979), actress
- Hal C. Kern (1894–1985), film editor
- Harry Kerr (1890–1957), songwriter, lyricist
- J. Warren Kerrigan (1879–1947), actor and director
- Charles Henry King (1853–1930), paternal grandfather of President Gerald Ford
- Leslie Lynch King Sr. (1884–1941), biological father of President Ford
- Dorothy Kirsten (1910–1992), operatic soprano singer
- Ted Knight (1923–1986), actor
- Clarence Kolb (1874–1964), actor
- Henry Kolker (1874 [or 1870]–1947), actor and director
- NP Red Kress (1905–1962), baseball player
- NP Kathryn Kuhlman (1907–1976), evangelist
- Edward A. Kull (1885–1946), cinematographer and director
- Robert Kurrle (1890–1932), cinematographer

== L ==
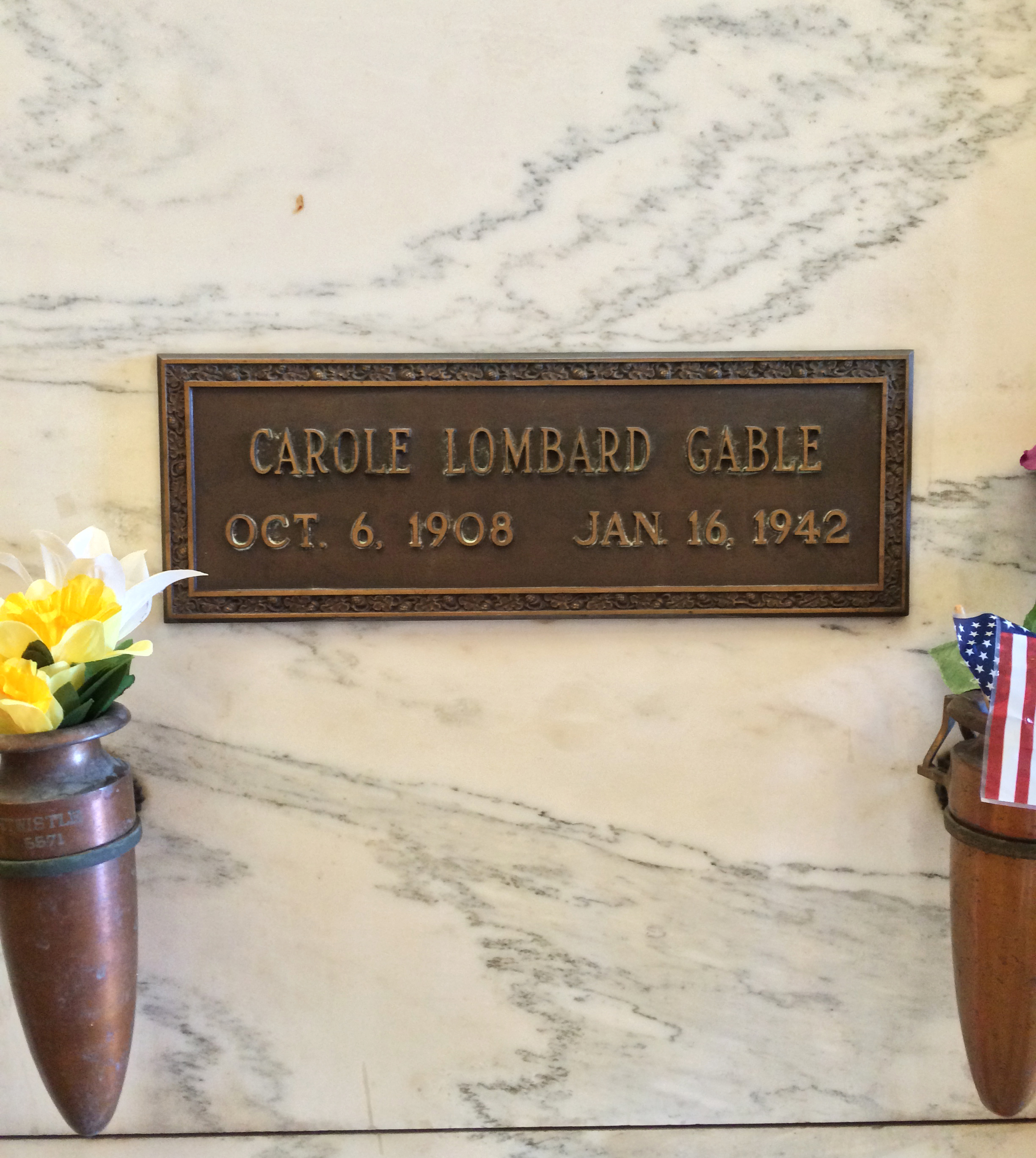
Crypt of Carole Lombard

- Louis L'Amour (1908–1988), novelist
- Alan Ladd (1913–1964), actor, father of Alan Ladd Jr. and David Ladd
- David Landau (1879–1935), actor
- Carole Landis (1919–1948), actress
- Rosemary Lane (1913–1974), actress
- Lash LaRue (1917–1996), B movie western actor, known for his bullwhip
- Ivan Lebedeff (1894–1953), actor
- Gretchen Lederer (1891–1955), actress
- Otto Lederer (1886–1965), actor
- Rowland V. Lee (1891–1975), motion picture director
- Mervyn LeRoy (1900–1987), director and producer
- Hal LeSueur (1901/1903–1963), actor, brother of Joan Crawford
- Fritz Leiber Sr. (1882–1949), actor
- Irene Lentz (1900–1962), costume designer, wife of F. Richard Jones
- Robert Z. Leonard (1889–1968), director
- Elgin Lessley (1883–1944), cinematographer
- Gus Levene (1911–1979), composer
- David Lewis (1903–1987), producer, partner of James Whale
- Mitchell Lewis (1880–1956), actor
- Ann Little (1891–1984), actress
- Lucien Littlefield (1895–1960), actor
- Robert Livingston (1904–1988), actor
- Doris Lloyd (1896–1968), actress
- Frank Lloyd (1886–1960), actor, director, producer, writer
- Harold Lloyd (1893–1971), actor and comedian
- Harold Lloyd Jr. (1931–1971), actor, singer, son of Harold Lloyd and Mildred Davis
- Jeanette Loff (1906–1942), actress and singer
- Arthur Loft (1897–1947), actor
- NP Carole Lombard (1908–1942), actress, wife of William Powell and Clark Gable
- Tom London (1889–1963), actor
- Claudine Longet (1942-2026), singer and actress
- Theodore Lorch (1873–1947), actor
- Ernst Lubitsch (1892–1947), director
- Ida Lupino (1918–1995), actress and director
- Hamilton Luske (1903–1968), animator and director
- Eustace Lycett (1914–2006), Disney visual/special effects artist

== M ==
- Jeanette MacDonald (1903–1965), actress and singer
- Jimmy MacDonald (1906–1991), Disney voice over artist, musician, head of Disney sound effects department, 2nd voice of Mickey Mouse
- Kenneth MacKenna (1899–1962), actor and director
- Mary MacLaren (1896–1985), actress
- Douglas MacLean (1890–1967), actor, producer, and writer
- Rouben Mamoulian (1897–1987), director
- Edwin L. Marin (1899–1951), director
- Oliver T. Marsh (1893–1941), MGM cinematographer, brother of actresses Marguerite Marsh and Mae Marsh, father of saxophonist Warne Marsh
- Warne Marsh (1927–1987), tenor saxophonist, son of MGM cinematographer Oliver T. Marsh
- Alan Marshal (1909–1961), actor
- Chico Marx (1887–1961), actor and comedian
- Gummo Marx (1893–1977), agent
- LeRoy Mason (1903–1947), actor
- NP Will Mastin (1878–1979), dancer and singer, leader of the Will Mastin Trio
- NP Daya Mata (1914–2010), religious leader
- Doris May (1902–1984), actress (unmarked grave)
- Erskine Mayer (1889–1957), baseball player
- Mike Mazurki (1907–1990), actor and wrestler
- Chuck McCann (1934–2018), voice actor
- Marian McCargo (1932–2004), actress
- Meade McClanahan (1894?–1959), Los Angeles City Council member
- Gladys McConnell (1905–1979), actress
- Ted McCord (1900–1976), cinematographer
- Johnston McCulley (1883–1958), author and writer, creator of Zorro
- Marc McDermott (1881–1929), actor
- Marie McDonald (1923–1965), actress and model
- Frank McGlynn Sr. (1866–1951), actor
- J. P. McGowan (1880–1952), director
- Frank McGrath (1903–1967), actor, Charlie Wooster on TV's Wagon Train
- Malcolm McGregor (1892–1945), actor
- Burr McIntosh (1862–1942), photographer, publisher, actor
- Wanda McKay (1915–1996), actress
- Robert McKimson (1910–1977), animator and director
- Thomas McKimson (1907–1998), animator and comic book artist, older brother of Robert McKimson
- James McLachlan (1852–1940), U.S. Representative from California
- NP Victor McLaglen (1886–1959), actor
- Jimmy McLarnin (1907–2004), boxing champion
- Gloria Hatrick McLean (1918–1994), model, animal rights activist and wife of actor Jimmy Stewart
- Norman Z. McLeod (1898–1964), director
- Joseph T. McNarney (1893–1972), US Army General
- Aimee Semple McPherson (1890–1944), evangelist
- Rolf McPherson (1913–2009), denominational leader, clergy, son of Aimee Semple McPherson
- Syd Mead (1933–2019), conceptual artist and futurist
- Henrietta Mears (1890–1963), Christian educator
- George Meehan (1891–1947), cinematographer
- Blanche Mehaffey (1908–1968), actress and dancer
- Dimitre Mehandjiysky (1915–1999), artist
- William C. Mellor (1903–1963), cinematographer
- William Cameron Menzies (1896–1957), art director
- Beryl Mercer (1882–1939), actress
- Iris Meredith (1915–1980), actress
- Bess Meredyth (1890–1969), screenwriter, wife of directors Wilfred Lucas and Michael Curtiz, mother of writer John Meredyth Lucas
- Ron W. Miller (1933–2019), businessman, football player, son-in-law of Walt Disney
- Robert Andrews Millikan (1868–1953), physicist and Nobel Prize winner
- Vincente Minnelli (1903–1986), director
- Tom Mix (1880–1940), actor
- Kid Mohler (1870–1961), baseball player and coach
- Orville Mohler (1909–1949), football and baseball player
- Polly Moran (1883–1952), actress and comedian
- Rushton Moreve (1948–1981), bassist of Steppenwolf
- Antonio Moreno (1887–1967), actor and director
- Clayton Moore (1914–1999), actor, The Lone Ranger
- Del Moore (1916–1970), comedian, actor and radio announcer
- Ernest Carroll Moore (1871–1955), educator, co-founder of University of California, Los Angeles
- Harvey Seeley Mudd (1888–1955), engineer and educator
- William Mulholland (1855–1935), engineered the Los Angeles Aqueduct, Mulholland Dam, St. Francis Dam and other dams, Panama Canal consultant, namesake of Mulholland Drive
- Ralph Murphy (1895–1967), film director
- Spud Murphy (1908–2005), composer
- Zon Murray (1910–1979), actor
- Harry C. Myers (1882–1938), actor and director

== N ==
- Charles W. Nash (1864–1948), automobile manufacturer, co-founder of Nash Motors
- Alla Nazimova (1879–1945), actress, founder and owner of Garden of Allah Hotel
- Frank Nelson (1911–1986), character actor/voice actor known for his "EEE-Yeeeeesss?" catchphrase and appearances on I Love Lucy, The Jack Benny Program, and Sanford and Son
- Skylar Neil (1991–1995), daughter of Vince Neil
- NP Alfred Newman (1900–1970), composer, patriarch of Newman family of composers
- Emil Newman (1911–1984), music director, conductor, composer, younger brother of Alfred Newman, member of Newman musical family
- Fred Niblo (1874–1948), director
- Gertrude Niesen (1911–1975), actress and singer
- William Nigh (1881–1955), actor, director, and writer
- Marian Nixon (1904–1983), actress
- L. L. Nunn (1853–1925), educator
- Ervin Nyiregyházi (1903–1987), pianist

== O ==
- Hugh O'Brian (1925–2016), actor
- Eugene O'Brien (1880–1966), actor
- Virginia O'Brien (1919–2001), actress and singer
- Cathy O'Donnell (1923–1970), actress, wife of producer Robert Wyler, sister-in-law of director William Wyler
- Nance O'Neil (1874–1965), actress
- Jack Oakie (1903–1978), actor and comedian
- Merle Oberon (1911–1979), actress
- Clifford Odets (1906–1963), playwright
- Charles Ogle (1865–1940), actor
- Edna May Oliver (1883–1942), actress
- Gertrude Olmstead (1897–1975), actress, wife of director Robert Z. Leonard
- Culbert Olson (1876–1962), California Governor
- Maria Ouspenskaya (1876–1949), actress
- Richard F. Outcault (1863–1928), cartoonist, inventor of the comic strip, creator of Buster Brown and The Yellow Kid
- NP Tudor Owen (1898–1979), character actor
- Monroe Owsley (1900–1937), actor
- Dennis O'Keefe (1908–1968), actor

== P ==
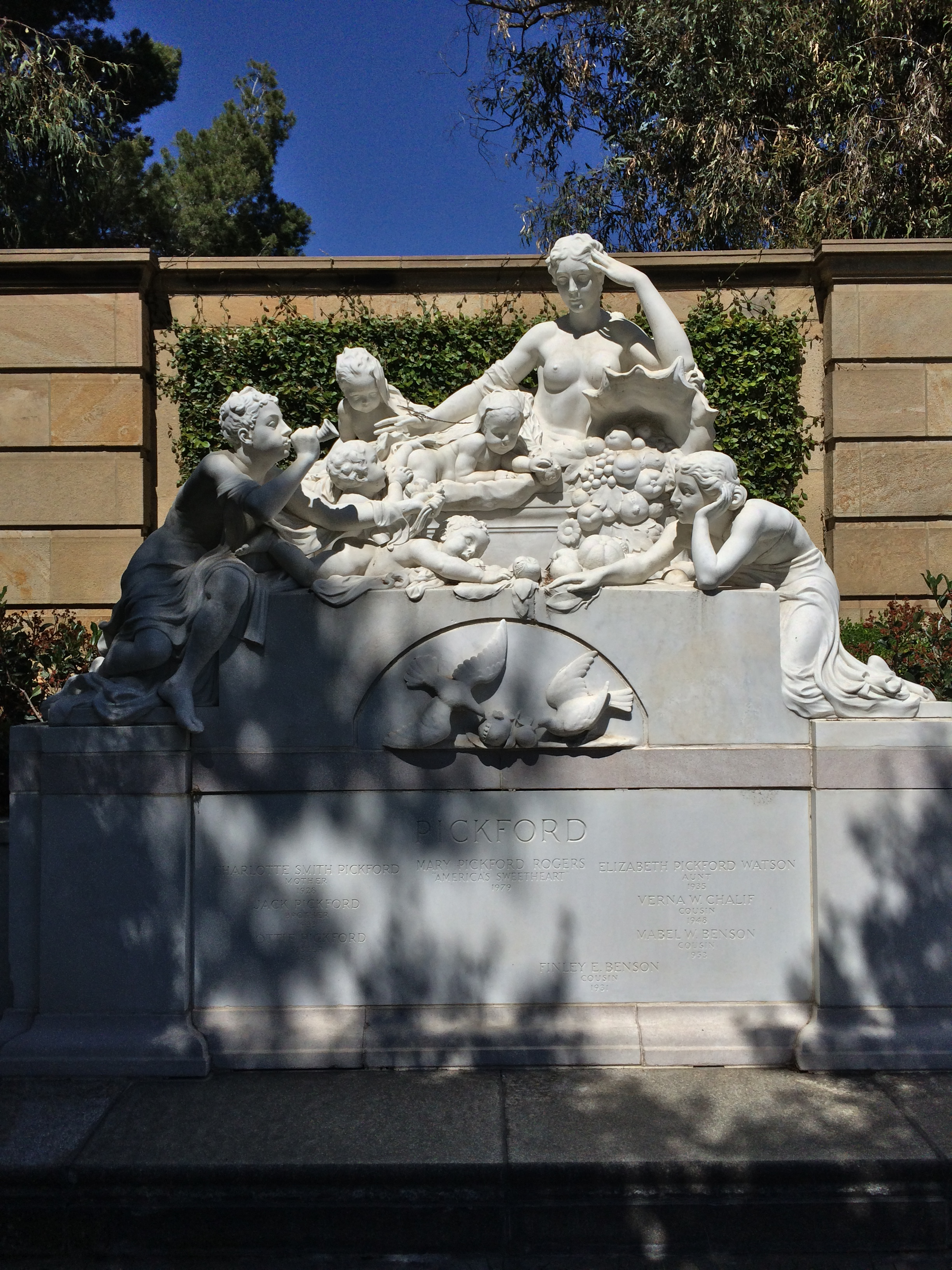
Tomb of Mary Pickford

- Doris Packer (1904–1979), actress
- Ernest Palmer (1885–1978), cinematographer
- Lilli Palmer (1914–1986), actress
- Franklin Pangborn (1889–1958), actor
- NP Alexander Pantages (1867–1936), theater impresario, founder of Pantages Theatres
- James Parrott (1897–1939), actor, comedian, and director, younger brother of Charley Chase
- Marion Parker (1915–1927), murder victim
- John B. Parkinson (1861–1935), architect
- Allen E. Paulson (1922–2000), aviation entrepreneur
- Claude Payton (1882–1955), actor
- Lucy Payton (1877–1969), actress
- Joe Penner (1904–1941), actor and comedian
- Susan Peters (1921–1952), actress
- Mary Philips (1901–1975), actress, wife of Humphrey Bogart and Kenneth MacKenna
- Clyde Phillips (1891–1946), Thoroughbred racehorse trainer
- Rich Piana (1970-2017), Bodybuilder, YouTuber, 5%er
- Ben Piazza (1933–1991), actor
- NP Jack Pickford (1896–1933), actor
- NP Lottie Pickford (1893–1936), actress
- NP Mary Pickford (1892–1979), actress, businesswoman, co-founder of United Artists
- Jack Pierce (1889–1968), makeup artist
- Robert Pierce (1914–1978), humanitarian and social reformer
- Michael Piller (1948–2005), screenwriter
- Jeff Porcaro (1954-1992), drummer for the rock band Toto
- Lon Poff (1870–1952), actor
- Rosa Porto (1930–2019), businesswoman
- NP Dick Powell (1904–1963), actor and singer
- John Robert Powers (1892–1977), model agency owner
- Steve Priest (1948–2020), musician
- Merrill Pye (1902–1975), art director

== Q ==
- Fred Quimby (1886–1965), producer of MGM and Hanna-Barbera animated cartoons
- John Qualen (1899–1987), actor

== R ==
- Paul Rader (1878–1938), evangelist
- John S. Ragin (1929–2013), actor
- Ralph Rainger (1901–1942), songwriter
- Addison Randall (1906–1945), actor
- Albertina Rasch (1891–1967), dancer, wife of Dimitri Tiomkin
- Charles Ray (1891–1943), actor, director, producer, screenwriter (unmarked grave)
- Gene Raymond (1908–1998), actor, husband of Jeanette MacDonald
- Jack Raymond (1886–1953), actor and director
- Michael Reagan (1945-2026), radio talk show host, writer
- Dorothea Holt Redmond (1910–2009), art director and set designer, wife of Harry Redmond Jr.
- Harry Redmond Jr. (1909–2011), special effects artist and producer
- Phillip Reed (1908–1996), actor
- Vivian Reed (1894–1989), silent film actress, wife of Alfred E. Green
- Wallace Reid (1891–1923), actor
- Frederick Emil Resche (1866–1946), U.S. Army brigadier general
- Craig Reynolds (1907–1949), actor
- Gene Reynolds (1923–2020), actor and television producer
- Lucille Ricksen (1910–1925), child actress
- Cleo Ridgely (1894–1962), actress
- Fritzi Ridgeway (1896–1961), actress
- Adele Ritchie (1874–1930), singer
- Lyda Roberti (1906–1938), actress
- Beverly Roberts (1914–2009), actress
- Blossom Rock (1895–1978), actress, older sister of Jeanette MacDonald
- Will Rogers (1879–1935), actor, humorist, newspaper columnist (moved to The Will Rogers Memorial in Claremore, OK in 1946)
- Jim Rohn (1930–2009), American entrepreneur
- Ruth Roland (1892–1937), actress and producer
- Gladys Root (1905–1982), criminal defense attorney
- Henry Roquemore (1886–1943), actor
- Alan Roscoe (1886–1933), actor
- Bodil Rosing (1877–1941), Danish actress, mother-in-law of Monte Blue
- J. Walter Ruben (1899–1942), director and screenwriter
- NP Charlie Ruggles (1886–1970), actor, older brother of Wesley Ruggles
- NP Wesley Ruggles (1889–1972), film director/producer, younger brother of Charlie Ruggles
- Barbara Ruick (1930–1974), actress
- William Russell (1884–1929), actor

== S ==
Grave of Jimmy Stewart

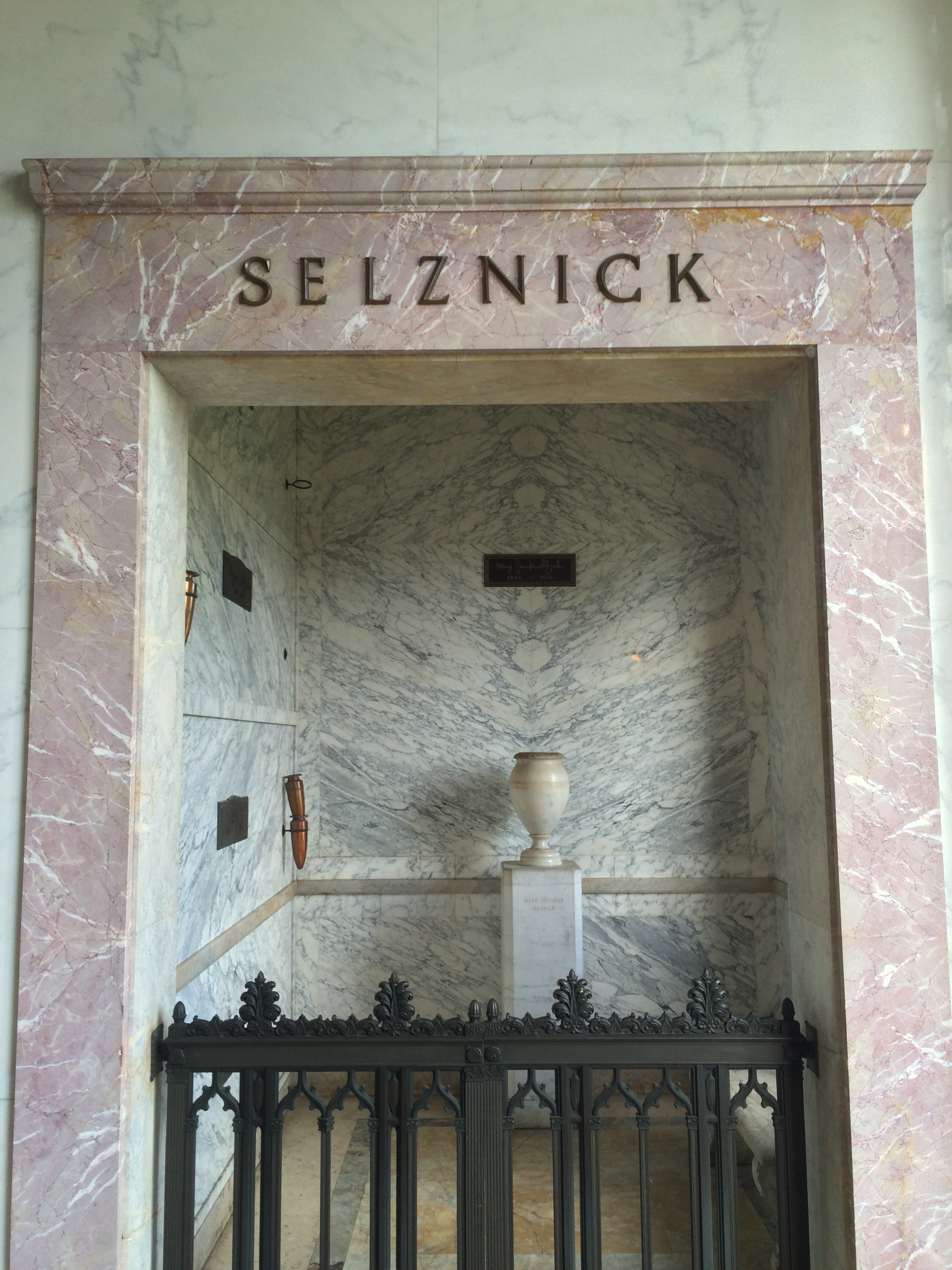
Tomb of David O. Selznick

- NP S. Z. Sakall (1883–1955), actor
- Chic Sale (1885–1936), actor
- Ben L. Salomon (1914–1944), dentist, posthumous recipient of Medal of Honor
- Hank Sanicola (1914–1974), songwriter
- Drake Sather (1959–2004), comedian and writer
- Jan Savitt (1907–1948) musician
- Paul Sawtell (1906–1971), Polish-born, American film score composer
- Paul Scardon (1874–1954), actor, producer, director
- Victor Schertzinger (1888–1941), composer, director, producer, screenwriter
- Mabel Julienne Scott (1892–1976), actress
- Ynez Seabury (1907–1973), actress
- Don Sebastian (1911–1987), wrestler
- Sybil Seely (1902–1984), actress
- William A. Seiter (1890–1964), director
- NP Lesley Selander (1900–1979), director
- William Edwin Self (1921–2010), actor and producer
- NP David O. Selznick (1902–1965), motion picture producer, founder of Selznick International Pictures
- NP Lewis J. Selznick (1869–1933), producer and motion picture industry pioneer
- NP Myron Selznick (1898–1944), motion picture producer and talent agent
- NP Fred Sersen (1890–1962), painter and special effects artist
- Helen Shaw (1897–1997), character actress
- Ethel Shannon (1898–1951), actress
- Kim Shattuck (1963–2019), singer
- Athole Shearer (1900–1985), actress, sister of Norma Shearer
- NP Norma Shearer (1902–1983), actress, wife of Irving Thalberg
- Del Shofner (1934–2020), football player
- Lowell Sherman (1885–1934), director and actor
- Clarence A. Shoop (1907–1968), Air Force General
- Leo Shuken (1906–1976), composer
- Louis Silvers (1889–1954), film composer
- S. Sylvan Simon (1910–1951), director
- Russell Simpson (1880–1959), actor
- NP Red Skelton (1913–1997), actor and comedian
- Edward Sloman (1886–1972), actor, director and screenwriter
- Tod Sloan (1874–1933), thoroughbred racing jockey, innovated low-crouch riding position over a horse's neck
- H. Allen Smith (1909–1998), politician, Congressman
- Harold Smith (1909–1958), Olympic diver
- Rainbeaux Smith (1955–2002), actress
- R. Thomas Smith (1878–1957), thoroughbred horse trainer
- NP William French Smith (1917–1990), U.S. Attorney General
- Roland N. Smoot (1901–1984), U.S. vice admiral
- Carrie Snodgress (1945–2004), actress
- Marguerite Snow (1889–1958), actress
- Carl Spitz (1894–1976), animal trainer
- Leo Spitz (1888–1956), film executive
- NP Bunker Spreckels (1949–1977), surfboard designer
- Hanley Stafford (1899–1968), actor
- John M. Stahl (1886–1950), director and producer
- NP Lionel Stander (1908–1994), actor
- Ernie Stanton (1890-1944) actor, athlete
- Jules C. Stein (1896–1981), physician, co-founder of MCA Inc. and the Jules Stein Eye Institute
- NP Max Steiner (1888–1971), composer
- Casey Stengel (1890–1975), Major League Baseball manager
- James Stephenson (1889–1941), actor
- Anita Stewart (1895–1961), actress
- Gloria Hatrick Stewart (1918–1994), actress and wife of James Stewart
- James Stewart (1908–1997), actor, retired Air Force major general
- Ruth Stonehouse (1892–1941), actress and director
- Axel Stordahl (1913–1963), composer and arranger
- Herbert Stothart (1885–1949), composer
- Archie Stout (1886–1973), cinematographer
- Joseph Strauss (1870–1938), architect, engineer of the Golden Gate Bridge
- Elbridge Amos Stuart (1856–1944), industrialist, Carnation Milk Company founder and president
- Jan Styka (1858–1925), painter

== T ==
Grave of Spencer Tracy

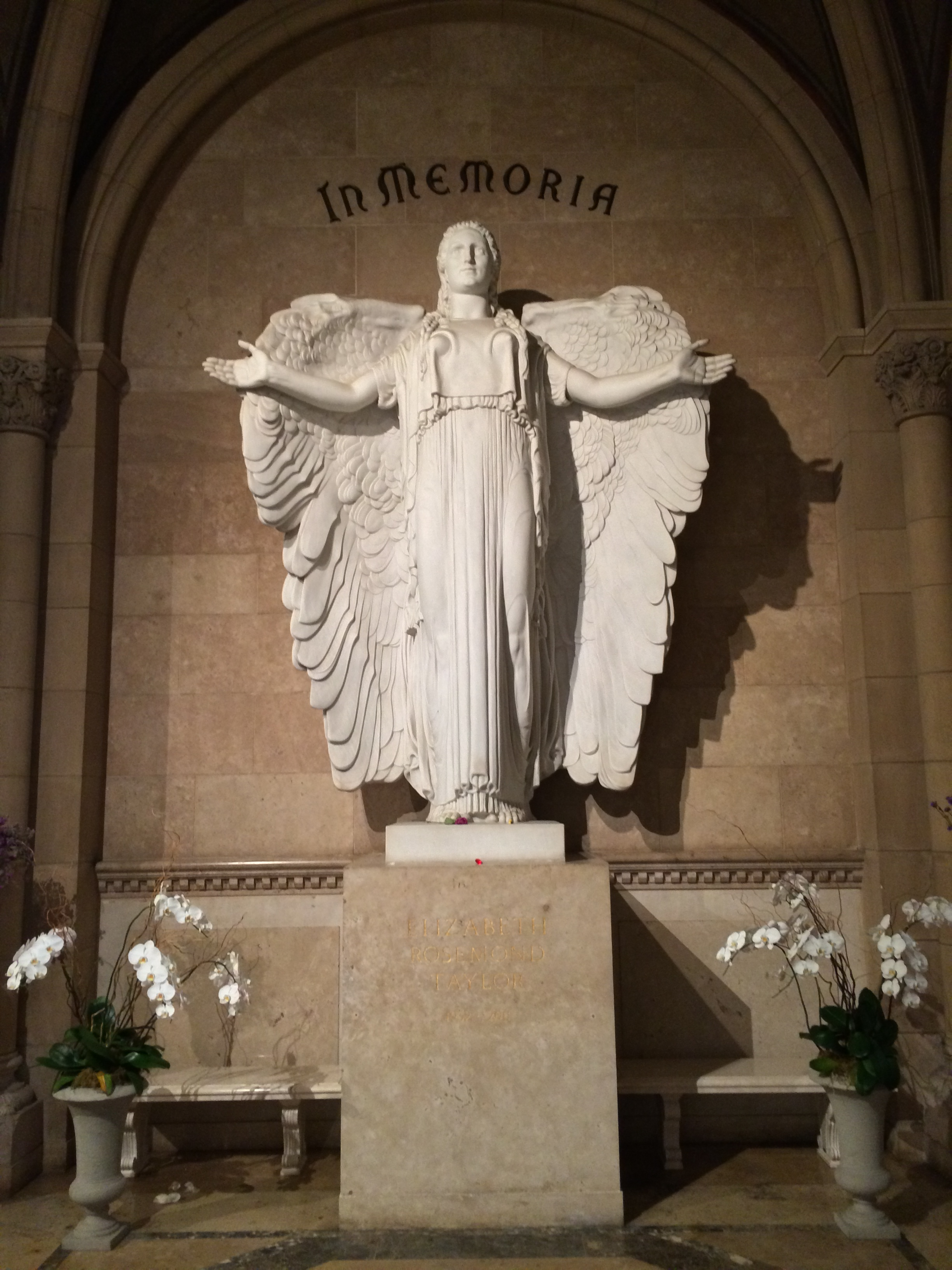
Crypt of Elizabeth Taylor

- Al Taliaferro (1905–1969), Disney cartoonist
- Frank Tashlin (1913–1972), animator, director, screenwriter
- Art Tatum (1909–1956), musician (relocated from Angelus-Rosedale Cemetery in 1991)
- Elizabeth Taylor (1932–2011), actress, activist
- Russi Taylor (1944–2019), voice actress
- NP Robert Taylor (1911–1969), actor
- Esta TerBlanche (1973–2024), actress
- NP Irving Thalberg (1899–1936), producer
- NP Ursula Thiess (1924–2010), actress, wife of Robert Taylor
- Jefferson Thomas (1942–2010), civil rights icon, member of the Little Rock Nine
- Fred Thomson (1890–1928), actor
- Edward L. Thrasher (1892–1971), Los Angeles City Council member
- Chief Thundercloud (1899–1955), actor
- Lawrence Tibbett (1896–1960), actor and opera singer
- Dimitri Tiomkin (1894–1979), composer
- Genevieve Tobin (1899–1995), actress, wife of William Keighley
- Sammee Tong (1901–1964), actor
- Ernest Torrence (1878–1933), actor
- Raquel Torres (1908–1987), actress
- Louise Tracy (1896–1983), founder of the John Tracy Clinic for deaf children, wife of Spencer Tracy
- Spencer Tracy (1900–1967), actor
- Henry Travers (1874–1965), actor
- Emerson Treacy (1900–1967), actor
- Lamar Trotti (1900–1952), reporter, screenwriter, producer, 20th Century Fox executive
- Jim Tully (1886–1947), writer
- Charlie Tuna (1944–2016), radio personality
- Ben Turpin (1869–1940), actor and comedian
- Lurene Tuttle (1907–1986), actress, mother of Barbara Ruick

== V ==
- Valda Valkyrien (1895–1956), ballerina
- NP Vang Pao (1929–2011), CIA and Royal Laotian Army General of Hmong descent
- W. S. Van Dyke (1889–1943), director
- Adamae Vaughn (1905–1943), actress
- Bobby Vernon (1897–1939), actor
- Alfred Victor Verville (1890–1970), aviation pioneer
- Theodore von Eltz (1893–1964), actor
- Rufus B. von KleinSmid (1875–1964), president of University of Arizona and University of Southern California
- Gustav von Seyffertitz (1862–1943), actor

== W ==
- George Waggner (1894–1984), actor, director and producer
- Sir William James Wanless (1865–1933), surgeon
- Jerry Wald (1911–1962), producer and screenwriter
- Charles Waldron (1874–1946), actor
- H. M. Walker (1878–1937), screenwriter
- Nella Walker (1886–1971), actress
- Beryl Wallace (1912–1948), singer, girlfriend of theatre producer, Earl Carroll
- Hal B. Wallis (1898–1986), producer
- Bill Walsh (1913–1975), Disney producer and screenwriter
- Clara Ward (1924–1973), gospel singer and songwriter
- Jay Ward (1920–1989), producer and writer of various animated series
- Ethel Waters (1896–1977), actress and singer
- Johnny "Guitar" Watson (1935–1996), musician
- Roy Webb (1888–1982), composer (unmarked grave)
- Alice Stebbins Wells (1873–1957), first American born female police officer, LAPD officer
- Mary Wells (1943–1992), singer
- Jerry West (1938–2024), professional basketball player
- Roland West (1885–1952), director
- Gordon Westcott (1903–1935), actor
- George Westmore (1879–1931), make-up artist and hairdresser, patriarch of the Westmore family
- Monte Westmore (1902–1940), make-up artist
- Perc Westmore (1904–1970), make-up artist
- Wally Westmore (1906–1973), make-up artist
- Jack Westrope (1918–1958), Hall of Fame jockey
- Carl Jules Weyl (1890–1948), art director
- James Whale (1889–1957), director
- Richard A. Whiting (1891–1938), composer of popular songs
- Gayne Whitman (1890–1958), actor
- Ted Wilde (1889–1929), director and screenwriter
- Clara Williams (1888–1928), actress
- Earle Williams (1880–1927), actor
- Kay Williams (1916–1983), actress and model, fifth wife of Clark Gable
- Robert Williams (1894–1931), actor
- Dorothy Wilson (1909–1998), actress
- Lois Wilson (1894–1988), actress
- Rex Wimpy (1899–1972), special-effects artist, cinematographer
- Claire Windsor (1892–1972), actress
- Grant Withers (1905–1959), actor
- Gloria Wood (1923–1995), singer and voice actress
- Sam Wood (1883–1949), director, producer, writer, actor
- Stacy Woodard (1902–1942), nature filmmaker
- Ali-Ollie Woodson (1951–2010), musician and member of The Temptations
- Bobby Womack (1944–2014), soul singer
- Harry Womack (1945–1974), soul singer, member of The Valentinos, younger brother of Bobby Womack, older brother of Cecil Womack
- George Woolf (1910–1946), Hall of Fame jockey, rider of Seabiscuit
- John Elgin Woolf (1908–1980), architect
- Robert Woolsey (1888–1938), actor and comedian
- Hank Worden (1901–1992), character actor
- Wallace Worsley (1878–1944), stage actor turned silent film director
- NP Philip K. Wrigley (1894–1977), chewing gum manufacturer, MLB executive, founder of the AAGPBL, son of William Wrigley Jr.
- NP William Wrigley Jr. (1861–1932), chewing gum magnate, owner of the Chicago Cubs
- Robert Wyler (1900–1971), producer, older brother of William Wyler, husband of Cathy O'Donnell
- William Wyler (1902–1981), director and producer
- Patrice Wymore (1926–2014), actress, widow of Errol Flynn
- NP Ed Wynn (1886–1966), actor and comedian, father of Keenan Wynn
- NP Keenan Wynn (1916–1986), character actor, son of Ed Wynn

== Y ==
- James "J-Dilla" Yancey (1974–2006), hip-hop producer
- Barton Yarborough (1900–1951), actor
- Celeste Yarnall (1944–2018), actress
- NP Paramahansa Yogananda (1893–1952), Indian spiritual guru and author
- Robert Young (1907–1998), actor
- Joe Yule (1892–1950), actor and father of Mickey Rooney

== Z ==
- Lee Zahler (1893–1947), composer, music director
