= Monte Westmore =

Hollywood make-up artist

- Born: Montague Westmore; 22 July 1902; Newport, Isle of Wight
- Died: 30 March 1940 (aged 37); Los Angeles, California, US
- Occupation: Make-up artist
- Years active: 1921–1940
- Employer(s): Famous Players–Lasky; Selznick International Pictures
- Known for: Gone with the Wind
- Children: Michael Westmore; Marvin Westmore; Monty Westmore
- Father: George Westmore
- Relatives: See Westmore family

Montague "Monte" Westmore (22 July 1902 – 30 March 1940) was a Hollywood make-up artist, the eldest of six sons of George Westmore. He worked for both the Famous Players–Lasky studio and Selznick International Pictures. He was the head of the makeup department at Selznick and worked on films including Gone with the Wind (1939) and Rebecca (1940). His death from a heart attack following a tonsillectomy has been credited to the heavy workload on Gone with the Wind. He had three sons, Marvin, Michael, and Monty, all of whom also became make-up artists.

== Biography ==
Monte was a member of the Westmore family and the oldest of George Westmore's six sons. He was born in Newport, Isle of Wight. Monte was the first of them to leave home, and in 1920 he began to work first in a lumber mill and then as a busboy at the Famous Players–Lasky studio. His brothers were Perc, Ern, Wally, Bud and Frank, who all went on to work in makeup departments in Hollywood based studios. The family would gain a combined star on the Hollywood Walk of Fame in 2008.

He worked on The Sheik (1921) and convinced actor Rudolph Valentino to allow him to do his makeup creating the clean Latin look in the process. He continued to be Valentino's makeup artist until the actor's death in 1926, and afterwards did freelance work with Gloria Swanson, Clara Bow and Sonia Henie. He was also responsible for making actor H. B. Warner control his drinking habit during the production of The King of Kings (1927), as he kept feeding the actor cod liver oil until he vomited whenever he turned up for his makeup whilst drunk. After several weeks, Warner stopped drinking.

His work on Mutiny on the Bounty (1935) led to him being hired as the head of the makeup department at Selznick International Pictures. He also worked at the Oddie Beauty Salon, where he coached Constance Nichols who went on to become the personal hairstylist for several Hollywood actors and actresses.

Mutiny on the Bounty resulted in Monte being the head of the makeup department for Gone with the Wind (1939), Intermezzo (1939) and Rebecca (1940). He personally did the makeup for Scarlett O'Hara in the screentests for Gone with the Wind and also oversaw the makeup on the extras seen in the film. He did not receive any screen credit for his work on the film, as makeup artists were not regularly given such credit until the following decade. The amount of work on Gone with the Wind has been credited with leading to his death. In 1940, he underwent a tonsillectomy, and following the operation he had a fatal heart attack on 30 March, a few months after the release of the film.

Monte had three sons, including Michael Westmore, who won an Oscar for Best Makeup for the film Mask (1985), and nine Emmy Awards. His son Monty Westmore was also nominated for both an Academy Award and Emmy Award. His third son was Marvin Westmore, the founder and CEO of the George Westmore Research Library & Museum.

== Partial filmography ==
- The Sheik (1921)
- The King of Kings (1927)
- Forbidden (1932)
- The Crusades (1935)
- Gone with the Wind (1939)
- Intermezzo (1939)
- Rebecca (1940)
