= Westmore =

Westmore may refer to:

== People ==
- McKenzie Westmore (born 1977), American actress who plays the role of Sheridan Crane on the television soap opera Passions
- Michael Westmore (born 1938), American makeup artist
- Wally Westmore (1906–1973), make-up artist for Hollywood films

== Other uses ==
- Westmore, Vermont, town in Orleans County, Vermont, United States
- Westmore family, prominent family in Hollywood make-up
