= George Westmore =

English-American hairdresser (1879-1931)

- Born: George Henry Westmore; 27 June 1879; Newport, Isle of Wight, United Kingdom
- Died: 12 July 1931 (aged 52); Hollywood, California, US
- Occupation: Hairdresser / make-up artist
- Spouses: Ada Savage (m. 1901; div. 1924) Anita Salazar (m. 1925)
- Children: Monte Westmore; Perc Westmore; Ern Westmore; Wally Westmore; Bud Westmore; Frank Westmore
- Relatives: Westmore family

George Henry Westmore (27 June 1879 – 12 July 1931) was an English hairdresser who emigrated to the United States with his family, including several relatives who became prominent in Hollywood. Specializing in wig-making, and later make-up, he established the first movie make-up department in 1917. In his youth, he spent eighteen months in the British Army cavalry during the Second Boer War.

== Biography ==
Westmore was born on the Isle of Wight, off the southern coast of England. On 6 November 1899, he signed up for British Army service, requesting to be placed in the cavalry. He served with the 16th The Queen's Lancers in the Second Boer War. He was discharged from service on 22 April 1901, at the rank of Private, having been found medically unfit for further service. His character description at the time described him as "Very good, trustworthy and obliging man" and "a first rate hairdresser, has been in charge of the regimental shop". He had served in the army for one year and 168 days.

Afterwards he became a hairdresser by trade, and while in England he was reported to have cut Winston Churchill's hair. He also became a hairdresser to the Court of St. James's. He emigrated to Canada, but afterwards moved to the United States. He first lived in Los Angeles, and subsequently worked in beauty parlours in St. Louis, Cleveland, San Antonio and New Orleans. He returned to Los Angeles to retire where he noted that actors did their own makeup−and weren't very good at it−so in 1917 he set up the first movie make-up department at the Selig Polyscope Company, while at the same time, he made wigs, and invented the hair-lace wig. He also worked for the Triangle Film Corporation and freelance. He was responsible for creating Mary Pickford's signature curls, and fake ones so that she didn't need to curl them each morning, which became a popular style and was imitated by Shirley Temple among others.

Westmore had always had a distant and somewhat competitive relationship with his children. As the era of motion picture sound dawned, he saw the careers and reputations of his sons grow and eclipse his own. He became depressed and despondent, feeling that his own accomplishments were forgotten. In 1931, he killed himself via mercury poisoning, and took four agonizing days to die as the mercury burned its way through his body.

== Legacy ==
George had six sons who went into the film make-up business, Monte, Perc, Ern, Wally, Bud and Frank, out of a total of nineteen children from his marriage to Ada Savage. He also had an additional daughter from his marriage to Anita Salazar. He is considered to be the patriarch of the Westmore family. His sons were make-up artists throughout the Golden Age of Hollywood.

In 2000, the first Georgie awards were held. Named after George Westmore, they were hosted by the International Alliance of Theatrical Stage Employees. The Hollywood Makeup Artist and Hair Stylist Guild Awards' lifetime achievement award is named after George Westmore and his son Monte was awarded it in 2000. George's grandson Marvin Westmore founded the George Westmore Research Library and Museum in Burbank, California. It was created to serve the students of the Westmore Academy of Cosmetic Arts. The academy was taken over by Empire Beauty Schools in 2010 and closed in 2012, but the library and museum remains open as of 2012.

== Filmography ==
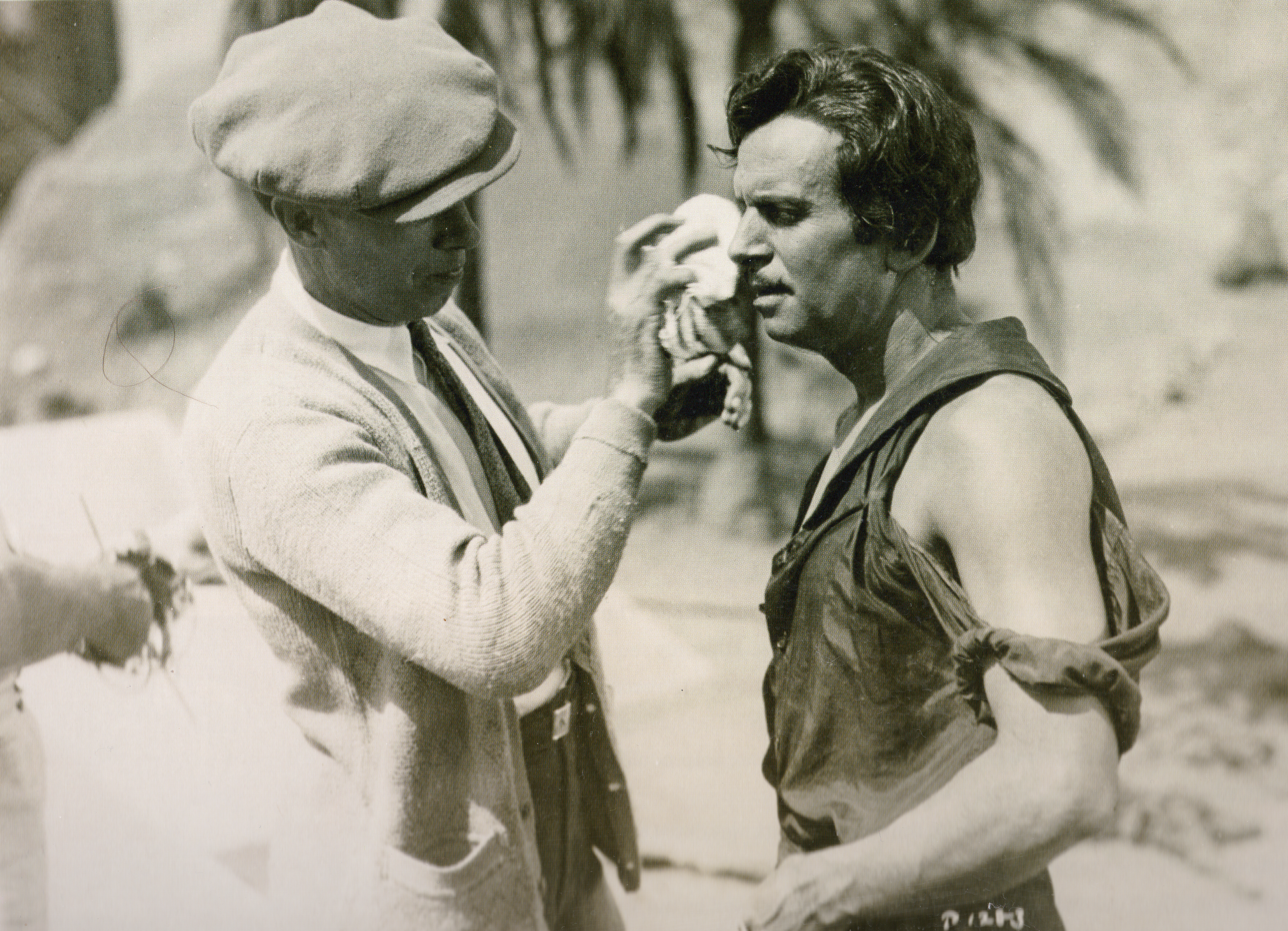
George Westmore applies makeup to Douglas Fairbanks during the production of The Black Pirate (1926)

Year	Title	Director
1921	The Education of Elizabeth	Edward Dillon
1921	The Three Musketeers	Fred Niblo
1921	The Nut	Theodore Reed
1921	The Sheik	George Melford
1922	Smilin' Through	Sidney Franklin
1922	Robin Hood	Allan Dwan
1923	Black Oxen	Frank Lloyd
1924	The Thief of Bagdad	Raoul Walsh
1924	Secrets	Frank Borzage
1924	The Goldfish	Jerome Storm
1925	Don Q Son of Zorro	Donald Crisp
1925	Ben-Hur	Fred Niblo
1926	The Black Pirate	Albert Parker
1930	The Rogue Song	Lionel Barrymore
1930	Call of the Flesh	Charles Brabin
1930	Romance	Clarence Brown
1930	A Lady's Morals	Sidney Franklin
1930	New Moon	Jack Conway
