= Wally Westmore =

American make-up artist

- Born: February 13, 1906
- Died: July 3, 1973 (aged 67)

Walter 'Wally' James Westmore (February 13, 1906 – July 3, 1973) was a make-up artist for Hollywood films.

Westmore was one of six brothers; all became notable film make-up artists. They were Monte, Perc, Ern, Wally, Bud and Frank.

Wally Westmore's career began with the highly successful Dr. Jekyll and Mr. Hyde (1931) in which the transition of Fredric March from Jekyll to Hyde was considered groundbreaking in the field of film make-up. He eventually went on to work on more than 300 films, mostly for Paramount.

== Filmography ==
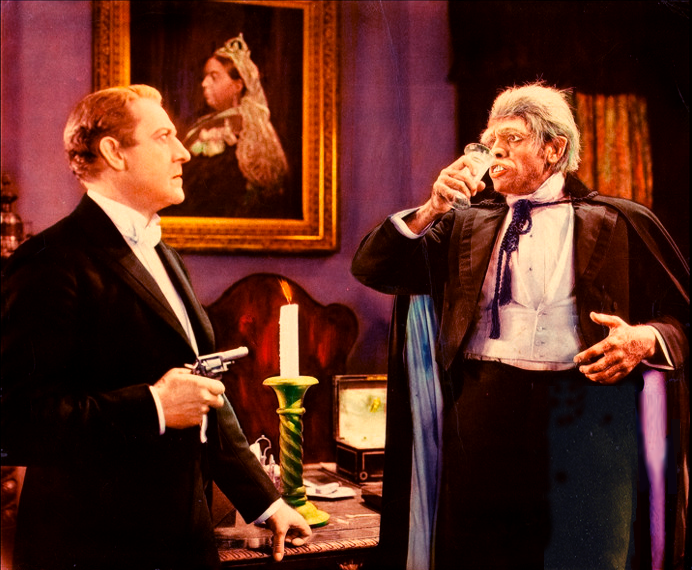
Wally Westmore's make-up transformed Fredric March's Doctor Jekyll into the grotesquely simian Mr Hyde.

Some of his more notable films include:

- Dr. Jekyll and Mr. Hyde (1931)
- Island of Lost Souls (1932)
- North West Mounted Police (1940)
- The Lady Eve (1941)
- Sullivan's Travels (1941)
- I Married a Witch (1942)
- Holiday Inn (1942)
- Road to Morocco (1942)
- Five Graves to Cairo (1943)
- For Whom the Bell Tolls (1943)
- Going My Way (1944)
- Double Indemnity (1944)
- Kitty (1945 film) (1945)
- The Strange Love of Martha Ivers (1946)
- Blue Skies (1946)
- California (1947)
- My Favorite Brunette (1947)
- The Perils of Pauline (1947 film) (1947)
- Desert Fury (1947)
- Unconquered (1947)
- Road to Rio (1947)
- The Big Clock (1948)
- The Emperor Waltz (1948)
- A Foreign Affair (1948)
- Sorry, Wrong Number (1948)
- Whispering Smith (1948)
- The Paleface (1948)
- A Connecticut Yankee in King Arthur's Court (1949)
- Streets of Laredo (film) (1949)
- The Heiress (1949)
- Sorrowful Jones (1949)
- Samson and Delilah (1949)
- ’’Branded’’ (1950)
- The File on Thelma Jordon (1950)
- Sunset Boulevard (1950)
- Union Station (film) (1950)
- A Place in the Sun (1951)
- Here Comes the Groom (1951)
- Red Mountain (1952)
- My Favorite Spy (1951)
- The Greatest Show on Earth (1952)
- Denver and Rio Grande (1952)
- Carrie (1952 film) (1952)
- Son of Paleface (1952)
- Just for You (1952 film) (1952)
- Road to Bali (1952)
- Come Back, Little Sheba (1952)
- The War of the Worlds (1953)
- Shane (1953)
- Stalag 17 (1953)
- Arrowhead (1953 film) (1953)
- The Caddy (1953)
- Roman Holiday (1953)
- Red Garters (film) (1954)
- The Naked Jungle (1954)
- Elephant Walk (1954)
- Rear Window (1954)
- Sabrina (1954)
- To Catch a Thief (1955)
- The Trouble with Harry (1955)
- The Rose Tattoo (1955)
- The Man Who Knew Too Much (1956)
- The Proud and Profane (1956)
- The Ten Commandments (1956)
- The Rainmaker (1956)
- Funny Face (1957)
- Gunfight at the O.K. Corral (1957)
- Loving you (1957)
- The Tin Star (1957)
- Desire Under the Elms (1958)
- Teacher's Pet (1958)
- Vertigo (1958)
- King Creole (1958)
- The Space Children (1958)
- The Five Pennies (1959)
- That Kind of Woman (1959)
- Career (1959)
- Li'l Abner (1959)
- Visit to a Small Planet (1960)
- One-Eyed Jacks (1961)
- The Ladies' Man (1961)
- Breakfast at Tiffany's (1961)
- Summer and Smoke (1961)
- The Man Who Shot Liberty Valance (1962)
- Hud (1963)
- Love with the Proper Stranger (1963)
- Barefoot in the Park (1967)
- The Odd Couple (1968)

== See also ==
- Westmore family
