= Monty Westmore =

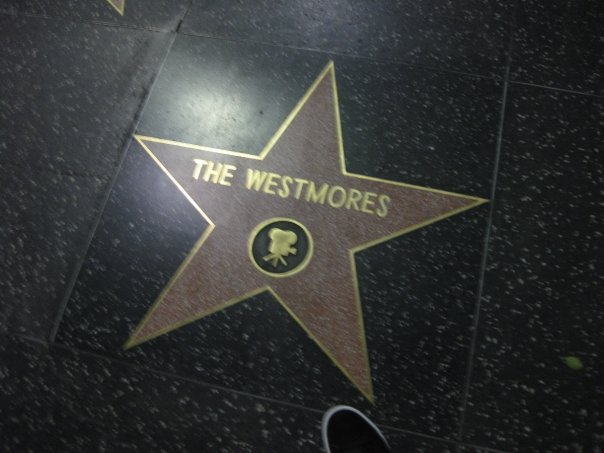
Photo of the Westmore family star on the Hollywood of Fame.

Montague George "Monty" Westmore (June 12, 1923 – November 13, 2007) was part of the third generation of the Westmore family of American make-up artists in film and television who worked on over 75 films and television series since 1950. He was the brother of make-up artist Michael Westmore and uncle of actress McKenzie Westmore, and film editor Michael Westmore II.

Westmore spent seven seasons as make-up artist on The Adventures of Ozzie and Harriet. He was screen legend Joan Crawford's personal make-up artist on the films What Ever Happened to Baby Jane? and Strait-Jacket and was a beneficiary of Crawford's will after her death in 1977. Westmore later served as Paul Newman's personal make-up artist on seventeen of the actor's films over the course of nearly three decades.

Westmore shared the 1991 Best Makeup Academy Award nomination for his work as assistant makeup supervisor on Steven Spielberg's Hook. He also received an Emmy Award nomination for the 1983 ABC drama Who Will Love My Children? starring Ann-Margret, and again in the 1996 HBO movie The Late Shift.

Westmore died in Woodland Hills, California in 2007 of prostate cancer.

== Partial filmography ==
- The Adventures of Ozzie and Harriet - 1958-66
- What Ever Happened to Baby Jane? - 1962
- The Towering Inferno - 1974
- 3 Women - 1977
- The Verdict - 1982
- Airplane II: The Sequel - 1982
- Who Will Love My Children? - 1983
- National Lampoon's European Vacation - 1985
- Stand by Me - 1986
- The Color of Money - 1986
- Alien Nation - 1988
- Fat Man and Little Boy - 1989
- Hook - 1991 (Academy Award nominee for Best Makeup)
- Chaplin - 1992
- Jurassic Park - 1993
- The Hudsucker Proxy - 1994
- The Shawshank Redemption - 1994
- Nobody's Fool - 1994
- Outbreak - 1995
- Se7en - 1995
- The Late Shift - 1996 (Emmy Award nominee for Outstanding Individual Achievement in Makeup for a Miniseries or a Special)
- Star Trek: First Contact - 1996
- Star Trek: Insurrection - 1998
- How the Grinch Stole Christmas - 2000

== See also ==
- Westmore family
