= Michael Westmore II =

American film editor and prosthetic technician (died 2026)

- Died: August 23, 2026
- Occupations: Film editor, prosthetic technician
- Parent: Michael Westmore (father)
- Relatives: Westmore family

Michael Westmore II (died August 23, 2026) was an American film editor and prosthetic technician. He was best known for his film editing work in the television programs Star Trek: The Next Generation and Star Trek: Deep Space Nine, and the films Halloween 5: The Revenge of Michael Myers, Star Trek: First Contact and Lionheart. Westmore died on August 23, 2026.
