= Marvin Westmore =

American make-up artist (1934–2020)

Marvin George Westmore (December 24, 1934 – November 28, 2020) was an American make-up artist in Hollywood, and part of the famed Westmore family. The son of Monte Westmore, he ran the Westmore Academy and was the Founder & CEO of the George Westmore Research Library & Museum in Burbank, California. His body frame and clothing styles were said to resemble that of The Price Is Right announcer Rod Roddy, and he played a Rod Roddy impersonator in a showcase on the January 11, 1994, episode of the game show.

He died in November 2020, at the age of 85.

== Selected filmography ==
- Dr. Dolittle
- The Buddy Holly Story
- Blade Runner
- The Best Little Whorehouse in Texas
- MacGyver
- Vegas Vacation

== See also ==
- Westmore family
