= Westmore family =

Family of make-up artists

The Westmore family is a well-known name in the Hollywood makeup industry. Beginning with patriarch George Westmore, the Westmore family has had five generations actively involved in Hollywood as makeup artists. George Westmore founded Hollywood's inaugural makeup department in 1917.

== Careers ==
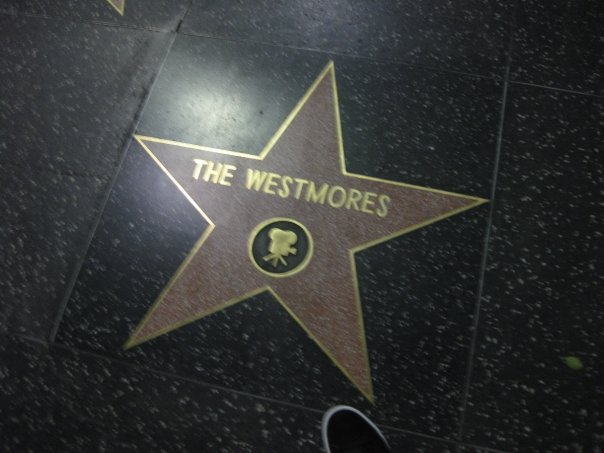
The Westmore Family star on the Hollywood Walk of Fame.

English wigmaker George Westmore, for whom the Makeup Artist and Hair Stylist Guild's George Westmore Lifetime Achievement Award is named, founded the first film makeup department at Selig Polyscope Company in 1917. Likewise, he also worked at Triangle, but soon began freelancing across the major studios. He understood that cosmetic and hair needs were personal, and made up stars such as Mary Pickford (whom he relieved of having to curl her famous hair daily by making false ringlets) and the Talmadge sisters (Norma and Constance) in their homes before they left for work in the morning.

He fathered three generations of movie makeup artists, beginning with his six sons—Perc (pronounced "perss" not "perk"), Ern, Monte, Wally, Bud, and Frank. By 1926, Monte, Perc, Ern, and Bud had become the chief makeup artists at four major studios and all continued to break ground in new beauty and horror illusions throughout their careers. In 1921, after dishwashing at Famous Players-Lasky, Monte became Rudolph Valentino's sole makeup artist. When Valentino died in 1926, Monte went to Selznick International. Thirteen years later, he worked himself to death with the enormous makeup demands for Gone with the Wind (1939).

In 1923, Perc began a career at First National-Warner Bros. Over twenty-seven years, he worked on the makeup in many films, including the faces of Charles Laughton's The Hunchback of Notre Dame and Bette Davis in The Private Lives of Elizabeth and Essex. In the early 1920s, he blended Stein Pink greasepaint with eye shadow, preceding Max Factor's Panchromatic. Ern, at RKO from 1929 to 1931 and then at 20th Century Fox from 1935, was adept at finding the right look for stars of the 1930s. Wally headed Paramount makeup in 1926, where he created Fredric March's gruesome transformation in Dr. Jekyll and Mr. Hyde (1931). Frank followed him there. Bud led Universal's makeup department for 23 years, specializing in rubber prosthetics.

Together, they built the House of Westmore Salon, which served stars and the public alike. Later generations have continued the name, including brothers Michael and Marvin, who have excelled in special makeup effects, such as in Blade Runner (1982), Mask (1985), and Raging Bull (1980).

Michael Westmore, a Make-Up Artist best known for his work in various Star Trek productions, has won nine Emmys.

== Prominent family members ==
- George Henry Westmore (June 27, 1879 – July 12, 1931)
  - Monte George Westmore (July 22, 1902 – March 30, 1940)
    - Monty George Westmore Jr. (June 12, 1923 – November 13, 2007)
    - Michael George Westmore (March 22, 1938)
      - McKenzie Westmore (April 26, 1977)
      - Michael Westmore II
    - Marvin George Westmore (December 24, 1934 – November 28, 2020)
      - Kandace Westmore
      - Kevin Westmore
  - Percival Harry Westmore (October 29, 1904 – September 30, 1970)
  - Ernest Henry Westmore (October 29, 1904 – February 1, 1967)
  - Walter James Westmore (February 13, 1906 – July 3, 1973)
    - Pamela Westmore
    - Mark Westmore, A.C.E.
  - Bud Westmore (January 13, 1918 – June 24, 1973)
  - Frank C. Westmore (April 13, 1923 – May 14, 1985)
