= Perc Westmore =

English-born American make-up artist (1904–1970)

- Born: Percival Harry Westmore; 29 October 1904; Canterbury, Kent, UK
- Died: 30 September 1970 (aged 65); North Hollywood, California, US
- Resting place: Forest Lawn Memorial Park, Glendale
- Occupation: Make-up artist
- Employer: Warner Bros.
- Parent(s): George Westmore; Ada Savage
- Relatives: Westmore family

Percival Harry Westmore (29 October 1904 – 30 September 1970) was a prominent member of the Westmore family of Hollywood make-up artists. He rose to the position of head of the Warner Bros. make-up department, and with his brothers founded the studio "The House of Westmore" on Sunset Boulevard in Los Angeles. He worked with well-known Hollywood actresses of the period, including Lauren Bacall, Bette Davis and Kay Francis. He was married four times, and collected cuttings relating to the Westmore family throughout his life which were subsequently donated to Academy of Motion Picture Arts and Sciences after his death.

== Biography ==
The House of Westmore beauty salon was opened on 16 April 1935, on Sunset Boulevard. Perc (pronounced "Perss" not "Perk") was instrumental in finishing the project, as the brothers had run out of money before finishing it. Whilst working on Stranded, he told actress Kay Francis of their plight. She responded by giving him a blank cheque to complete the project, which he cashed for $25,000. Francis, along with other stars of the day including Marlene Dietrich, Clara Bow and Carole Lombard, subsequently helped launch the studio.

Whilst he was head of the Warner Brothers make-up department, he piloted several changes including introducing a description of shades of hair colour to use different types of make-up more appropriately. Whereas prior to Perc, studios described actresses simply as blonde or brunette, Perc introduced a chart of thirty five shades of blonde alone. During the production of one film, Perc created a detailed latex hand for a close-up shot. According to Perc's brother Frank, the hand was so detailed that he was visited by doctors to study it and the process was adapted for use by the medical industry.

Perc was involved in the House of Westmore beauty product range, and one promotion run by the company gave away copies of "Perc Westmore's Make-up Guide". One such advertisement described Perc's achievements as "responsible for the coilfure and make-up of such great stars as Bette Davis, Ann Sheridan, Merle Oberon, Olivia de Havilland, Brenda Marshall... and at one time or another has worked with practically every great star of Hollywood."

He made an onscreen cameo in the 1937 film Hollywood Hotel. Perc was the make-up artist for Bette Davis during the filming of The Private Lives of Elizabeth and Essex in 1939, where she became the first Hollywood actress to appear bald on screen (although it was actually only a couple of inches of her hairline which was shaved, to appear bald under wigs). This wasn't due to Westmore's ideas, but because Davis wanted to appear historically accurate as Queen Elizabeth I. He very nearly changed Lauren Bacall's styling to something similar to Marlene Dietrich when Bacall attended for her screen test prior to her first film for Warner Bros. Bacall panicked at the suggestion and called producer Howard Hawks who insisted to Perc that he should leave her the way she was.

In 1951, he worked with the United States Navy to develop a hair style for female personnel which would stand up to sea breezes and prevent the hair from falling against the collar, which at the time was against regulations. Perc died of a heart attack on 30 September 1970, at his home in North Hollywood. He is interred at Glendale's Forest Lawn Memorial Park. He was posthumously nominated for Outstanding Achievement in Make-up at the 23rd Primetime Emmy Awards in 1971 for his work on The Third Bill Cosby Special. The award went to Robert Dawn for Mission: Impossible.

On 3 October 2008, the Westmore family received a star on the Hollywood Walk of Fame for their work in the motion picture industry.

== Personal life ==
Perc was a member of the Westmore family, and twin brother of Ern Westmore. Perc was rumoured to be involved in an affair with Kay Francis, but no reference to it was found in Francis' diaries. He was married on several occasions, to Virginia Thomas, Gloria Dickson, Juliette Novis and Margaret Valetta. He was also engaged to Betty Hutton, who broke off the engagement later saying it was because he bored her.

During his marriage to Dickson, she vanished for several days with the story reaching the media. He adopted a daughter with Virginia Thomas, also named Virginia. When Margaret Valetta's divorce was processed in 1951 on the grounds of cruelty, she had a signed agreement with Perc that she would have custody of Virginia.

== Legacy ==
Perc Westmore collected a number of clippings and recordings featuring himself and his family. The combined collection of 42 scrapbooks, plus recordings and manuscript material were donated by Ola Carroll Westmore to the Academy of Motion Picture Arts and Sciences in 1971 after his death.

== Partial filmography ==
- The Greater Glory (1925)
- The Lost World (1925)
- The Man Who Played God (1932)
- Mystery of the Wax Museum (1933)
- The Roaring Twenties (1939)
- Dodge City (1939)
- The Private Lives of Elizabeth and Essex (1939)
- It All Came True (1940)
- They Drive by Night (1940)
- "The Bride Came C.O.D." (1941)
- The Maltese Falcon (1941)
- High Sierra (1941)
- The Nurse’s Secret (1941)
- Sergeant York
- The Strawberry Blonde (1941)
- They Died with Their Boots On (1941)
- Gentleman Jim (1942)
- Larceny, Inc. (1942)
- Now, Voyager (1942)
- All Through the Night (1942)
- Casablanca (1942)
- Action in the North Atlantic (1943)
- Destination Tokyo (1943)
- Passage to Marseille (1944)
- Arsenic and Old Lace (1944)
- Mr. Skeffington (1944)
- The Mask of Dimitrios (1944)
- To Have and Have Not (1944)
- Objective, Burma! (1945)
- Mildred Pierce (1945)
- Night and Day (1946)
- Humoresque (1946)
- Deception (1946)
- The Time, the Place and the Girl (1946)
- My Wild Irish Rose (1947)
- Possessed (1947)
- Dark Passage (1947)
- The Treasure of the Sierra Madre (1948)
- Romance on the High Seas (1948)
- Two Guys from Texas (1948)
- Adventures of Don Juan (1948)
- One Sunday Afternoon (1948)
- Key Largo (1948)
- Rope (1948)
- Flamingo Road (1949)
- Beyond the Forest (1949)
- The Fountainhead (1949)
- White Heat (1949)
- Chain Lightning (1950)
- The Damned Don't Cry (1950)
- Caged (1950)
- Bright Leaf (1950)
- Storm Warning (1951)
- The Good Guys and the Bad Guys (1969)
- There Was a Crooked Man... (1970)

== Published works ==
- Westmore, Perc (1956). The Westmore Beauty Book. Chicago: Melvin Korshak Publishers.
