= Frank Westmore =

Frank Courtney Westmore (April 13, 1923 – May 14, 1985) was a Hollywood make-up artist, part of the Westmore family who were credited with introducing the art of make-up to the Hollywood movie industry.

He was born in Maywood, California, and died of a heart ailment in St. Joseph's Medical Center in Burbank, California. Frank was the last surviving Westmore brother.

After apprenticing at Paramount Pictures with his brother Wally, he worked on films such as Farewell, My Lovely, The Ten Commandments, Houseboat, Two for the Seesaw and The Towering Inferno, and television series such as The Munsters, Planet of the Apes, Bonanza, Hart to Hart and Kung Fu. For the last of these he won the Emmy Award for "Outstanding Achievement in Makeup" in 1972, and was also nominated unsuccessfully the following year. He was nominated a third time in 1978 with his nephew Michael for A Love Affair: The Eleanor and Lou Gehrig Story. He also co-wrote a biography of the family, The Westmores of Hollywood in 1976.

== Bibliography ==
- Frank Westmore & Muriel Davidson, The Westmores of Hollywood, Lippincott (1976), 256pp, ISBN 0-397-01102-4

== See also ==
- Westmore Family
