= Bud Westmore =

Make-up artist (1918–73)

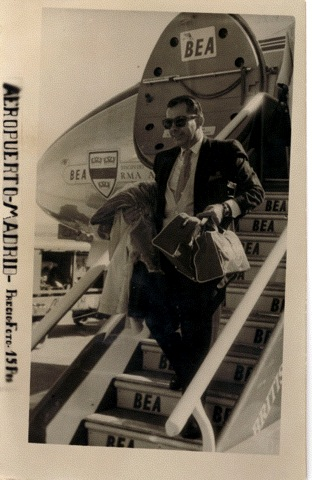
- Born: George Hamilton Westmore; January 13, 1918; New Orleans, Louisiana, U.S.
- Died: June 24, 1973 (aged 55); Los Angeles, California, U.S.
- Occupation: Make-up artist
- Years active: 1938–1973
- Spouses: Martha Raye (m. 1937; div. 1937) Rosemary Lane (m. 1941; div. 1954) Jeanne Shores (m. 1955)
- Children: 5
- Parent: George Westmore
- Relatives: See Westmore family

Bud Westmore (January 13, 1918 – June 24, 1973) was a make-up artist in Hollywood, and a member of the Westmore family of makeup.

== Life and career ==
Son of George Westmore, a member of the Westmore family prominent in Hollywood make-up, he is credited on over 450 movies and television shows, including Creature from the Black Lagoon (1954), Man of a Thousand Faces (1957), the Stanley Kubrick-directed Spartacus (1960), To Kill a Mockingbird (1962), and The Andromeda Strain (1971). He was sometimes credited as George Hamilton Westmore.

Westmore was head of the Universal Studios make-up department during the production of Creature from the Black Lagoon. Although he was credited for the design of the creature, it was designed by Milicent Patrick.

In addition to film, Bud worked extensively in television, on shows such as The Virginian, The Munsters, Rod Serling's Night Gallery, and Dragnet.

In 1957, Mattel asked Bud to design the makeup look of their soon-to-be-iconic doll, Barbie.

== Personal life ==
Westmore was married to actress and singer Martha Raye for five months in 1937. His second wife was actress Rosemary Lane, one of the famous Lane Sisters, who appeared in a number of movies in the 1930s and 40s. They had a daughter together. Westmore later married Jeanne Shores, a contestant and the winner of the 1952 Miss California Pageant, and they had four children together.

== Death ==
Westmore died at the age of 55 on June 24, 1973, due to a heart attack.

== Selected filmography ==
- Detour (1945)
- Brute Force (1947)
- Ride the Pink Horse (1947)
- The Wistful Widow of Wagon Gap (1947)
- A Double Life (1947)
- Black Bart (1948)
- The Naked City (1948)
- All My Sons (1948)
- Abbott and Costello Meet Frankenstein (1948)
- Tap Roots (1948)
- One Touch of Venus (1948)
- Mexican Hayride (1948)
- Criss Cross (1949)
- Red Canyon (1949)
- Calamity Jane and Sam Bass (1949)
- Winchester '73 (1950)
- Kansas Raiders (1950)
- Harvey (1950)
- The Strange Door (1951)
- The Cimarron Kid (1952)
- Bend of the River (1952)
- Has Anybody Seen My Gal (1952)
- The Duel at Silver Creek (1952)
- The Black Castle (1952)
- The Lawless Breed (1953)
- Abbott and Costello Meet Dr. Jekyll and Mr. Hyde (1953)
- The Man from the Alamo (1953)
- The Golden Blade (1953)
- It Came from Outer Space (1953)
- War Arrow (1954)
- Creature from the Black Lagoon (1954)
- Bengal Brigade (1954)
- The Far Country (1954)
- Sign of the Pagan (1954)
- Abbott and Costello Meet the Keystone Kops (1955)
- Captain Lightfoot (1955)
- Man Without a Star (1955)
- Cult of the Cobra (1955)
- This Island Earth (1955)
- Abbott and Costello Meet the Mummy (1955)
- To Hell and Back (film) (1955)
- All That Heaven Allows (1955)
- The Benny Goodman Story (1956)
- Star in the Dust (1956)
- Pillars of the Sky (1956)
- The Mole People (1956)
- Battle Hymn (1957)
- Gun for a Coward (1957)
- The Incredible Shrinking Man (1957)
- The Deadly Mantis (1957)
- Tammy and the Bachelor (1957)
- Night Passage (1957)
- Man of a Thousand Faces (1957)
- The Land Unknown (1957)
- The Tarnished Angels (1957)
- The Monolith Monsters (1957)
- Touch of Evil (1958)
- Ride a Crooked Trail (1958)
- The Perfect Furlough (1958)
- Curse of the Undead (1959)
- Imitation of Life (1959)
- This Earth Is Mine (1959)
- Pillow Talk (1959)
- Operation Petticoat (1959)
- Portrait in Black (1960)
- Spartacus (1960)
- Midnight Lace (1960)
- Posse from Hell (1961)
- The Last Sunset (1961)
- Come September (1961)
- Back Street (1961)
- Flower Drum Song (1961)
- Lover Come Back (1961)
- Lonely Are the Brave (1962)
- That Touch of Mink (1962)
- The Spiral Road (1962)
- If a Man Answers (1962)
- To Kill a Mockingbird (1962)
- The Ugly American (1963)
- Showdown (1963)
- The List of Adrian Messenger (1963)
- Tammy and the Doctor (1963)
- A Gathering of Eagles (1963)
- The Thrill of It All (1963)
- For Love or Money (1963)
- Father Goose (1964)
- The Art of Love (1965)
- The Rare Breed (1966)
- Thoroughly Modern Millie (1967)
- Coogan's Bluff (1968)
- Topaz (1969)
- Airport (1970)
- The Beguiled (1971)
- Soylent Green (1972)

== See also ==
- Westmore family
