= Ern Westmore =

American makeup artist

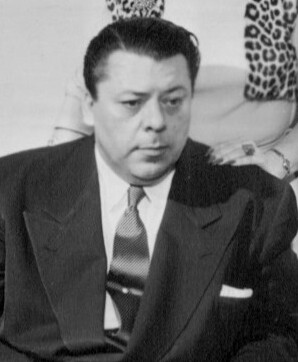
Westmore in 1955.

Ernest Henry Westmore (October 29, 1904 – February 1, 1967), was a Hollywood makeup artist and actor, the third child in George Westmore's famed Westmore family.

== Career ==
Ern was also involved in the creation of the House of Westmore with three of his brothers. It was billed as a place of beauty, primarily for women, and Ern was forced to borrow $40,000 from John Barrymore and Errol Flynn to assist in the financing, never paying them back.

In 1955, Babb set Westmore up with his own television series. Originally called Hollywood Today, but also called Hollywood Backstage and The Ern Westmore Show, The Ern Westmore Hollywood Glamour Show was a program featuring make-up tips and beauty suggestions.

Ern struggled with alcoholism throughout his life, drinking as early as 1921. Often involved with Barrymore, John Decker, and W. C. Fields, Ern would eventually be forced out of Warner Bros. because of his alcohol problem. Ern also struggled in his personal life due to his vices, having been married four times during his life, fathering two children.

Ern died in New York City in 1967 of an apparent heart attack.
