= Azart =

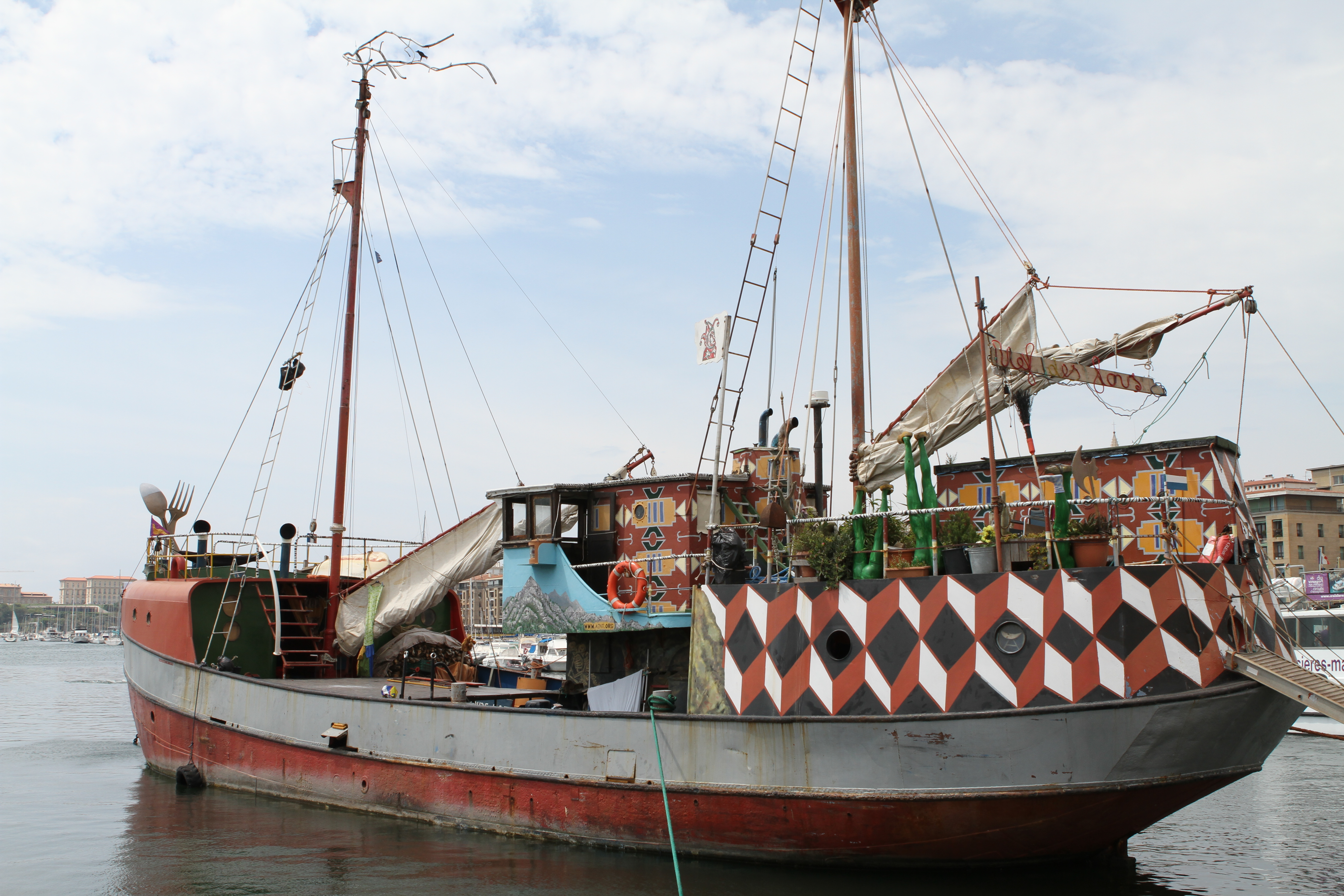
- The Azart in 2011 in Marseille

History
- Name: Azart (1989–)
- Launched: 1916
- Out of service: 2021
- Identification: Call sign: PCWX
- Nickname(s): The Ship of Fools
- Fate: Beached, converted to art centre

Azart (also self-described as "The Ship of Fools") is a Dutch ship that from 1992 to 2021 operated as a touring theatre on worldwide voyages. It was later beached in Ecuador and established there as a local cultural centre. Azart is also the name for the theatre company connected to the boat, led by August Dirks.

== History ==
The ship itself was built in 1916 as a lugger and used for many years for herring fishing.

In 1987 the ship was purchased by the cultural organisation "Azart" and given this name, and from 1989 used for musical events in Amsterdam.

In 1992 Azart set sail for its first tour of European harbours, with a touring show. In 1999 Azart received funding from the Dutch national funding agency Prins Bernhard Cultuurfonds. In 2008 Azart began its second major voyage to Greece, returning to Amsterdam in 2015. Its third voyage to Australia began in 2018 via Cape Verde and Suriname. In 2020 Azart's transit to Australia was aborted due to covid lockdowns and concerns about the boat's readiness to cross the Pacific. Altogether, between 1989 and 2008 the Azart visited 19 countries and more than 120 towns, giving more than 800 shows.

In 2021 the Azart was finally beached on the Ecuador coast, and established as an art centre for the local community.

== Legacy ==
A square Azartplein in Amsterdam was named after the ship Azart in 1994.. The square lies between Java-eiland and KNSM Island, and was frequently the mooring location for the Azart.

A full-length film about Azart was released in 2026, named Azart Come Make Art.
