= HNLMS Janssens =

Royal Netherlands Navy Troopship

History

Netherlands
- Name: Janssens
- Laid down: 1934
- Launched: 1935
- Commissioned: 8 December 1941
- Out of service: 4 May 1942
- Fate: Returned to the KPM

General characteristics
- Type: Troopship
- Displacement: 2,071 t (2,038 long tons) standard
- Length: 80.8 m (265 ft 1 in)
- Beam: 13.13 m (43 ft 1 in)
- Draught: 4.5 m (14 ft 9 in)
- Installed power: 1,000 hp (750 kW)
- Propulsion: 1 × 6-stroke Sulzer diesel engine
- Speed: 11 knots (20 km/h; 13 mph)
- Complement: 60 crew; 965 passengers
- Armament: 2 × single 5 cm (2.0 in) cannons; 4 × single 12.7 mm (0.50 in) machine guns

HNLMS Janssens was originally the passenger ship MS Janssens operated by Koninklijke Nederlandse Stoomboot-Maatschappij (KPM). She would be commandeered and militarized by the Royal Netherlands Navy on 8 December 1941.

== Service history ==
Serving as a troopship during the defense of the Dutch East Indies, her final journey in Netherlands naval service would be the evacuation of around 750 naval personnel including crewmembers from USS Houston, USS Marblehead and the British ship SS War Sirdar from Tjilatjap harbor to Fremantle, Australia. Janssens was supposed to be escorted by HNLMS Valk, however, due to the desertion by some of the native Indonesian crew, Valk was unable to leave the harbor. After Janssens left port unescorted, a growing feeling of potential mutiny led the captain to stop in Patjitan harbor to let around 250 native crew disembark. Janssens then continued her journey and arrived safely at Fremantle after which on 4 May 1942 the ship was returned to the KPM.
