= List of Madrid parks =

A list of parks in Madrid, Spain, sorted by district, is presented as follows:

== Arganzuela ==
- Parque Enrique Tierno Galván; 45.8 ha.
- Parque Madrid Río (also in Centro, Carabanchel, Usera, Latina, Moncloa-Aravaca and Villa de Vallecas); 121.1 ha.

== Barajas ==
- Parque del Capricho; 17.6 ha.
- Parque Juan Carlos I; 210.38 ha.

== Centro ==
- Campo del Moro; 24.51 ha.
- Parque Madrid Río (also in Arganzuela, Carabanchel, Usera, Latina, Moncloa-Aravaca and Villa de Vallecas); 121.1 ha.

== Carabanchel ==
- Parque de las Cruces (also in Latina); 37 ha.
- Parque Emperatriz María de Austria (aka Parque Sur); 42 ha.

== Centro ==
- Parque Madrid Río (also in Arganzuela, Centro, Usera, Latina, Moncloa-Aravaca and Villa de Vallecas); 121.1 ha.
- Parque de San Isidro; 27 ha.

== Chamartín ==
- Parque de Berlín, 4.79 ha.

== Fuencarral-El Pardo ==
- Parque Norte; 19,5 ha.

== Hortaleza ==
- Parque Forestal de Valdebebas-Felipe VI; 470 ha.

== Latina ==
- Parque Aluche; 16 ha.
- Parque del Cerro Almodóvar; 18.5 ha.
- Parque de las Cruces (also in Carabanchel); 37 ha.
- Parque de la Cuña Verde de Latina; 52.41 ha.
- Parque Madrid Río (also in Arganzuela, Carabanchel, Centro, Usera, Moncloa-Aravaca and Villa de Vallecas); 121.1 ha.

== Moncloa-Aravaca ==
- Casa de Campo; 1,508.97 ha.
- Dehesa de la Villa; 65.55 ha.
- Parque de la Bombilla; 12.71 ha.
- Parque Madrid Río (also in Arganzuela, Carabanchel, Centro, Usera, Latina and Villa de Vallecas); 121.1 ha.
- Parque del Oeste; 61.41 ha.

== Puente de Vallecas ==
- Parque Lineal del Manzanares (also in Usera); 97.3 ha in the municipality of Madrid.
- Parque Lineal de Palomeras; 38.4 ha.
- Parque del Cerro del Tío Pío; 17 ha.

== Retiro ==
- El Retiro; 120.67 ha.
- Jardín Botánico; 8.09 ha.
- Parque de Roma; 11.54 ha.

== Salamanca ==
- Parque de la Quinta de la Fuente del Berro; 8.12 ha.

== San Blas-Canillejas ==
- Parque Quinta de los Molinos; 12.9 ha.
- Pinar de la Elipa; 15.19 ha.

== Tetuán ==
- Parque Agustín Rodríguez Sahagún; 13,84 ha.
- Parque de la Ventilla; 8.36 ha.

== Usera ==
- Parque Lineal del Manzanares (also in Puente de Vallecas); 97.3 ha in the municipality of Madrid.
- Parque Madrid Río (also in Arganzuela, Carabanchel, Centro, Latina, Moncloa-Aravaca and Villa de Vallecas); 121.1 ha.
- Parque de Pradolongo; 42.4 ha.

== Villa de Vallecas ==
- Parque Forestal de Entrevías; 88.84 ha.
- Parque Forestal M-40; 11.6 ha.
- Parque Madrid Río (also in Arganzuela, Carabanchel, Centro, Usera, Latina and Moncloa-Aravaca); 121.1 ha.
- Parque Santa Eugenia; 13.9 ha.

== Villaverde ==
- Parque de Plata y Castañar; 23.3 ha.
