= Eastern Docklands =

Oostelijk Havengebied
- Neighborhood of Amsterdam
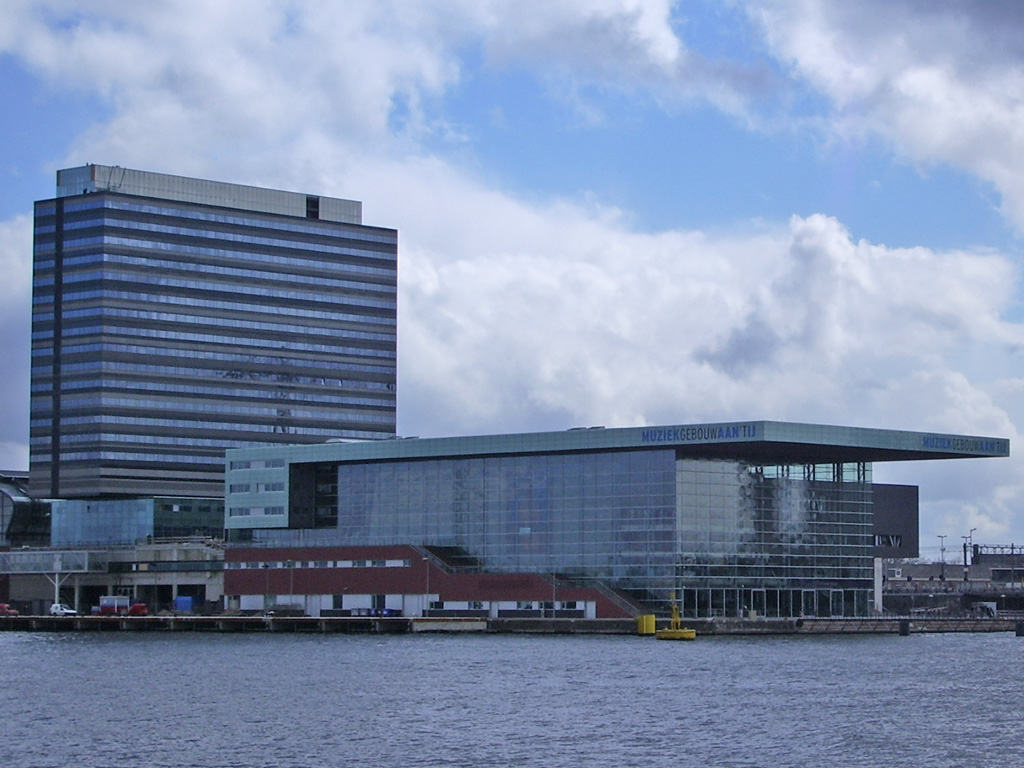

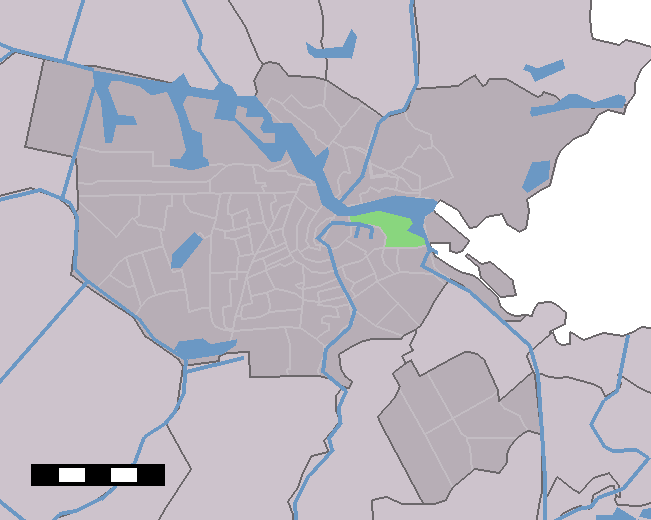
- Location in Amsterdam
- Coordinates: 52°22′N 4°56′E
- Country: Netherlands
- Province: North Holland
- COROP: Amsterdam
- Borough: Oost
- Time zone: UTC+1 (CET)

The Eastern Docklands (Dutch: Oostelijk Havengebied) is a neighborhood of Amsterdam, Netherlands, located between the IJ and the Nieuwe Vaart in the borough of Amsterdam-Oost. The harbor area was constructed in the late nineteenth century to allow for increasing trade with the Dutch East Indies; a new location was necessitated by the construction of the Amsterdam Centraal railway station, which replaced the old quays. East of the new station was a marshy area called De Rietlanden, with the Zeeburgerdijk (then called Sint Antoniesdijk), running via the Zeeburch, a fort, to the Zuiderzee.

The neighborhood consists of the districts: KNSM Island, Java-eiland, Oostelijke Handelskade, Cruquiuseiland, Borneo-eiland and Sporenburg.

The area, about 2/3 water and 1/3 land, consists of an extension of the Oostelijke Handelskade, east of the center of town, and four artificial "islands" (peninsulas), all of which were former industrial and harbor locations of the port of Amsterdam. In the early 2000s, after a large-scale reorganization, the city's biggest post-World War II building project, the Eastern Docklands was de-industrialized and became home to some 17,000 people living in some the highest population densities in the Netherlands.

== History ==
=== Construction ===
Map of the area.

In the mid-nineteenth century the Dutch government determined that the city's open harbor front was to be filled in to allow for the construction of the Amsterdam Centraal railway station (the city decided on its location in 1869, and it was built 1882-1889), despite objections by the city; the building of the railway station followed necessarily on the Dutch government's decision in 1860 to build a national railroad system. Also, because ship sizes had increased but the Amsterdam's docks had not, competition from other cities began to hurt the city economically; in 1860 Den Helder had overtaken Amsterdam in port activity. To compensate for the loss of that harbor area and to create quays that would allow bigger ships to dock, Amsterdam's city engineer, Jacobus van Niftrik, planned a new quay to the east of the station, the Oostelijke Handelskade. This quay was the start of the Eastern Docklands, which was developed contiguous to the already existing port area, the Spoorwegbassin, which would be used for the transloading of coal and iron ore; railroad tracks already crisscrossed the area. Other decisions played a part in the construction of the area, such as the digging of the North Sea Canal, decided on in 1862.

The development of the Oostelijke Handelskade (1876) gave Amsterdam a deep-water harbor for the first time in its history, and warehouses such as Europa, Azië, and Africa jumpstarted economic activity in 1883. The quay was designed according to modern requirements, with a railroad track and steam-powered cranes for loading and unloading.

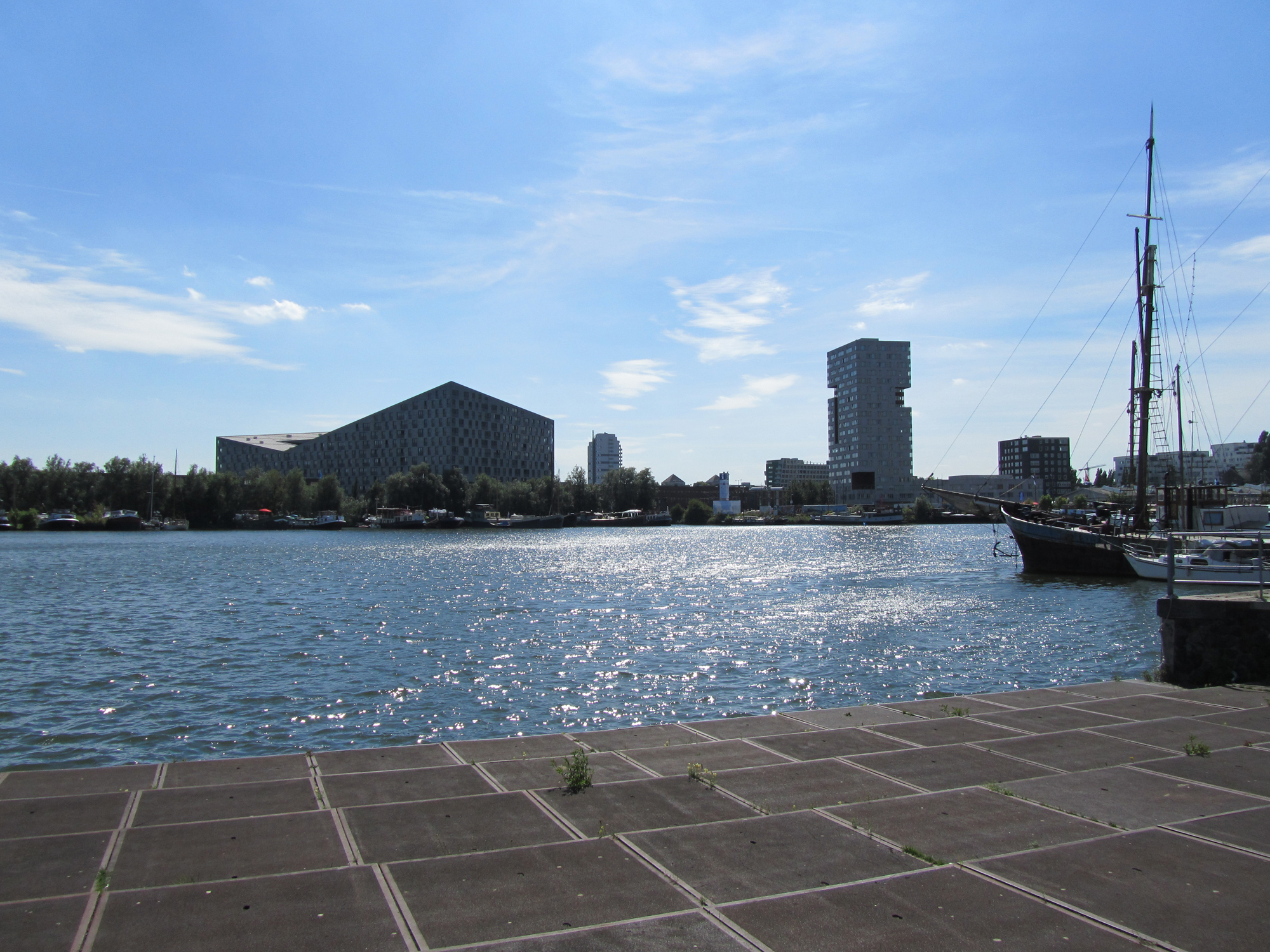
Modern architecture in the Eastern Docklands. View south towards Sporenburg from Levantkade on Java-eiland. On the left is the apartment building The Whale.

One problem was the Zuiderzee, which caused high waves and disturbed harbor activity. The city decided to build a breakwater, but this was unsuccessful, and in 1890 a dam was planned, the start of the future Java Island and KNSM Island. In 1896 the IJkade was constructed contiguous to the dam, and the closed-in area raised with earth won from dredging the North Sea Canal, the digging of which had started in 1876. When the western part of the IJkade was lengthened in 1904, a new peninsula was created, as well as two harbors: the water between the Java Island and the Oostelijke Handelskade is called the IJhaven, the water south of the KNSM Island is called the Ertshaven, both also being connected by rail.

The deep-water harbors allowed for much economic development. In 1903, the Koninklijke Nederlandse Stoomboot-Maatschappij (KNSM) settled on the eastern part of the island and experienced rapid growth. On the western part, one of the occupants was the Stoomvaart Maatschappij Nederland (SMN), which had reached the limit of its possible expansion on the Oostelijke Handelskade. In the first half of the 20th century there was ongoing development, including for instance the increasing transport of passengers by ship to the Dutch East Indies, but after World War II harbor activity moved more to the city's Western Docklands and in the 1960s, despite the coming of some new industries such as Mobil, the area became less busy, due to the increase in containerisation and the ever-growing size of cargo ships. In the 1970s, the area fell into complete disuse.

== Panorama ==
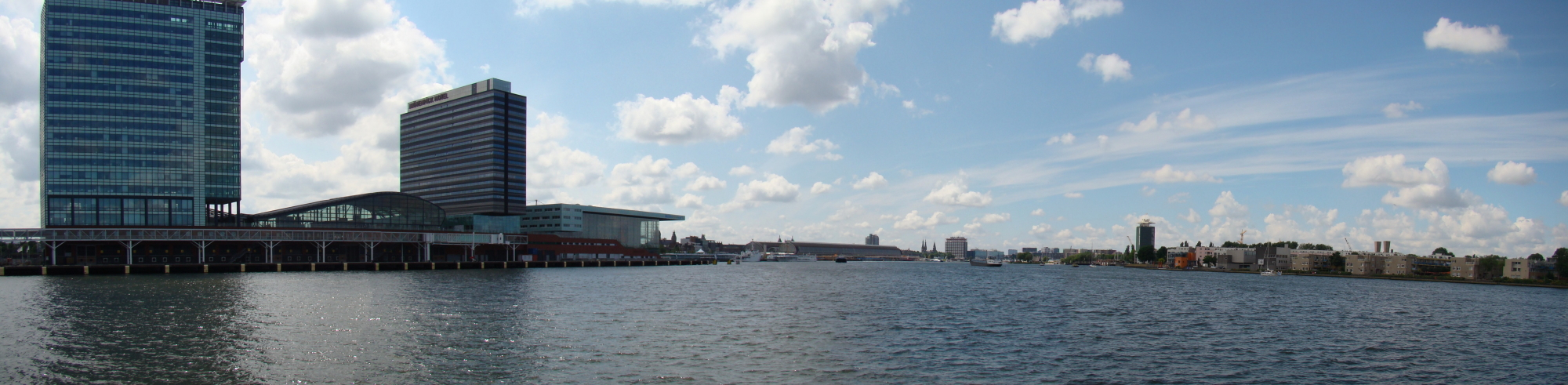
Panorama over the IJ from Java Island.

== Recent development ==
In the 1980s, The city decided to change the by now derelict area into space for residences, and even proposed to fill in the harbors. In the end, the harbors and islands remained intact, to create relatively quiet enclaves of residential neighborhoods.

Many of the homes in the Eastern Docklands attract young families, which has led to more families with young children staying in the city (rather than move to places like Almere, which offer more affordable family homes with gardens). The area is also attractive to "trendy" and well-to-do urbanites; the notably modern features of the new buildings in the "architecturally spectacular" area draw in "trendy young media and IT professionals" and are a boon for tourism to the area.

Since 2005, the fast IJtram has connected the area to the Central Station where one can transfer to other tram lines. The Piet Hein Tunnel offers a fast route for motor vehicles to the A10 ringroad.

The Borneo Sporenburg Residential Waterfront development, by architects Adriaan Geuze/West 8, has received the Veronica Rudge Green Prize in Urban Design from Harvard University's Graduate School of Design in 2002.

=== Oostelijke Handelskade ===
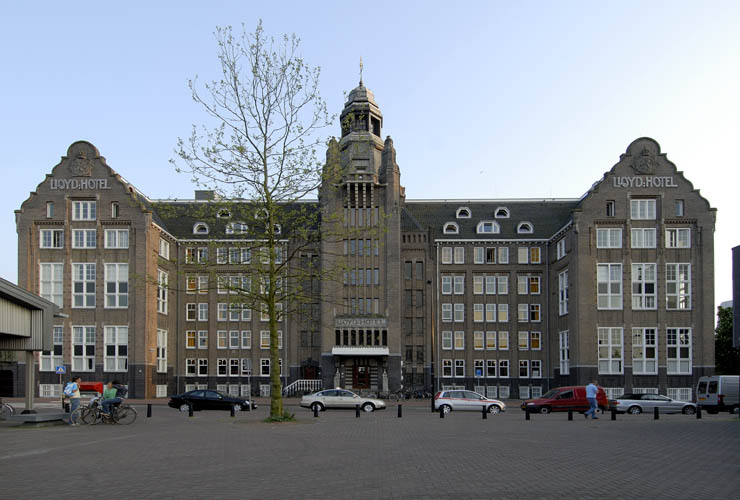
The Lloyd Hotel in 2006.

A central element in the development of the Docklands is the Oostelijke Handelskade, the Eastern Quay. Located on the IJ harbor, it ran along the docks to the east of the center of Amsterdam and got its name in 1883. Previously known as Handelskade, it was built between 1875 and 1883. In 1919 part of the quay was renamed Piet Hein Kade. In 2001, it became connected to Java Island by Jan Schaefer Bridge.

One of its characteristic buildings is the Lloyd Hotel, which was constructed in 1921 by Evert Breman as temporary housing for emigrants to Latin America, many of whom from Eastern Europe. During World War II it was used as a prison by the German occupiers, and after the war it retained that function. It became a prison for underage convicts in 1964. After 1989 it stood empty for a time, and in 1996 the city of Amsterdam opened a competition to turn the building into a hotel. That conversion, designed by Otto Nan, was finished in 2004 (with 120 rooms).
