= Schouwburgplein (Rotterdam) =

Square in Rotterdam, Netherlands

Coordinates: 51°55′15″N 4°28′25″E

Theatre Square
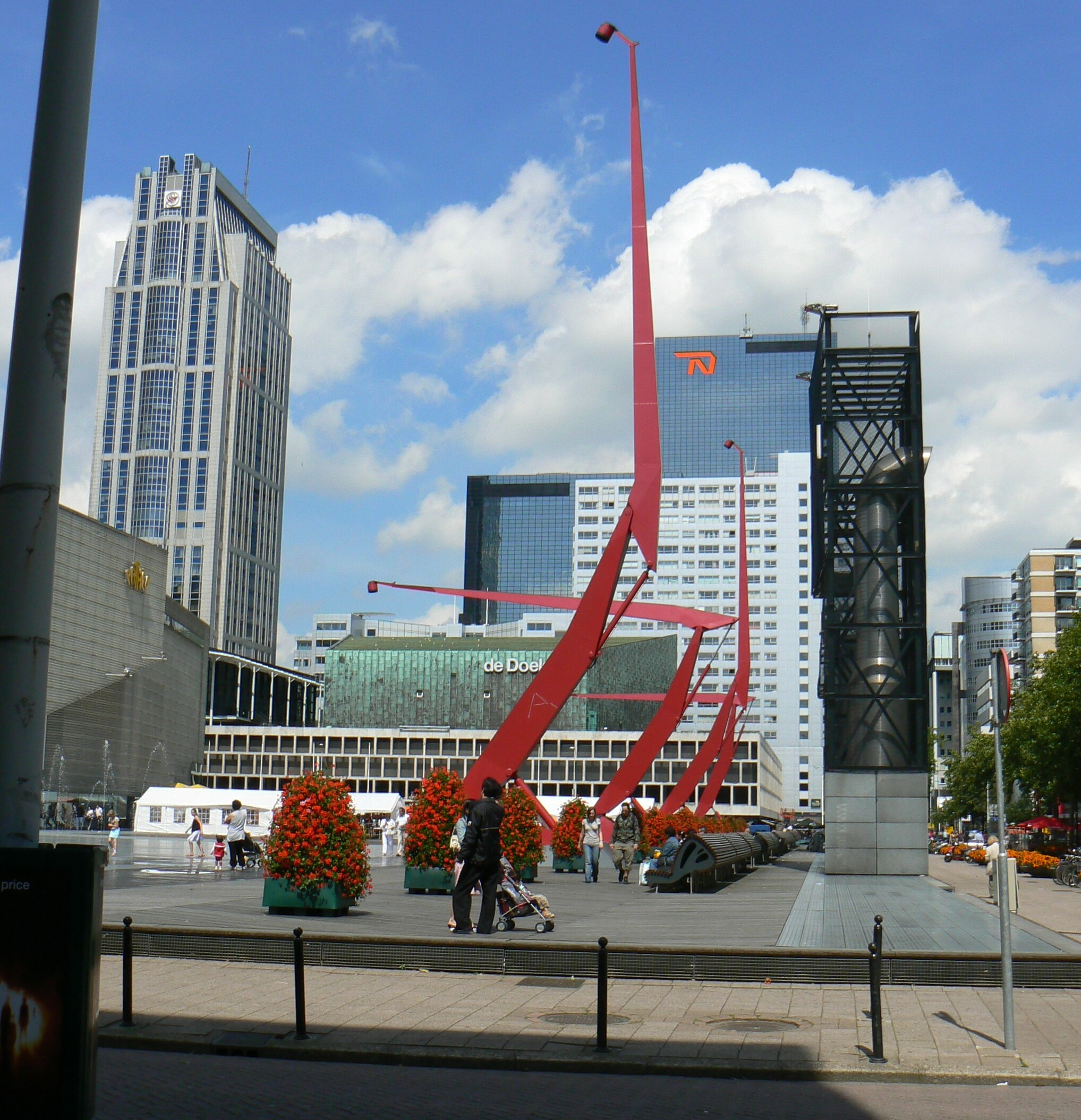
- The Theatre Square (Schouwburgplein) in Rotterdam
- Native name: Schouwburgplein (Dutch)
- Location: Rotterdam, Netherlands

Theatre Square (or in Dutch : Schouwburgplein) is a plaza situated in the heart of the city of Rotterdam, and is flanked by the municipal theatre, concert hall, restaurants, and cafes.

An urban stage and an interactive open space, the 12.250 square meter square is designed by West 8, the landscape architecture firm founded by Adriaan Geuze. The design emphasizes the importance of a void, which opens a panorama towards the city skyline. It opened to the public in 1996.

== History ==
Before World War II the area was a densely populated neighbourhood.

In the 1960s the square was constructed including underground parking and the De Doelen concert hall.

The square was redesigned in 1996 by Adriaan Geuze and his firm West 8. A model of the design is in the Museum of Modern Art in New York. The Project for Public Spaces included the redesigned square in its Hall of Shame, calling it "a perfect example of how a design statement cannot be a great square"

== External links and references ==
- Square dance - Schouwburgplein, Rotterdam, the Netherlands, by Connie Van Cleef, Jan. 1998.
