= West 8 =

Dutch landscape architecture firm

- Formation: 1987
- Headquarters: Rotterdam
- Location: Netherlands
- Key people: Adriaan Geuze
- Staff: 70
- Website: https://www.west8.com/

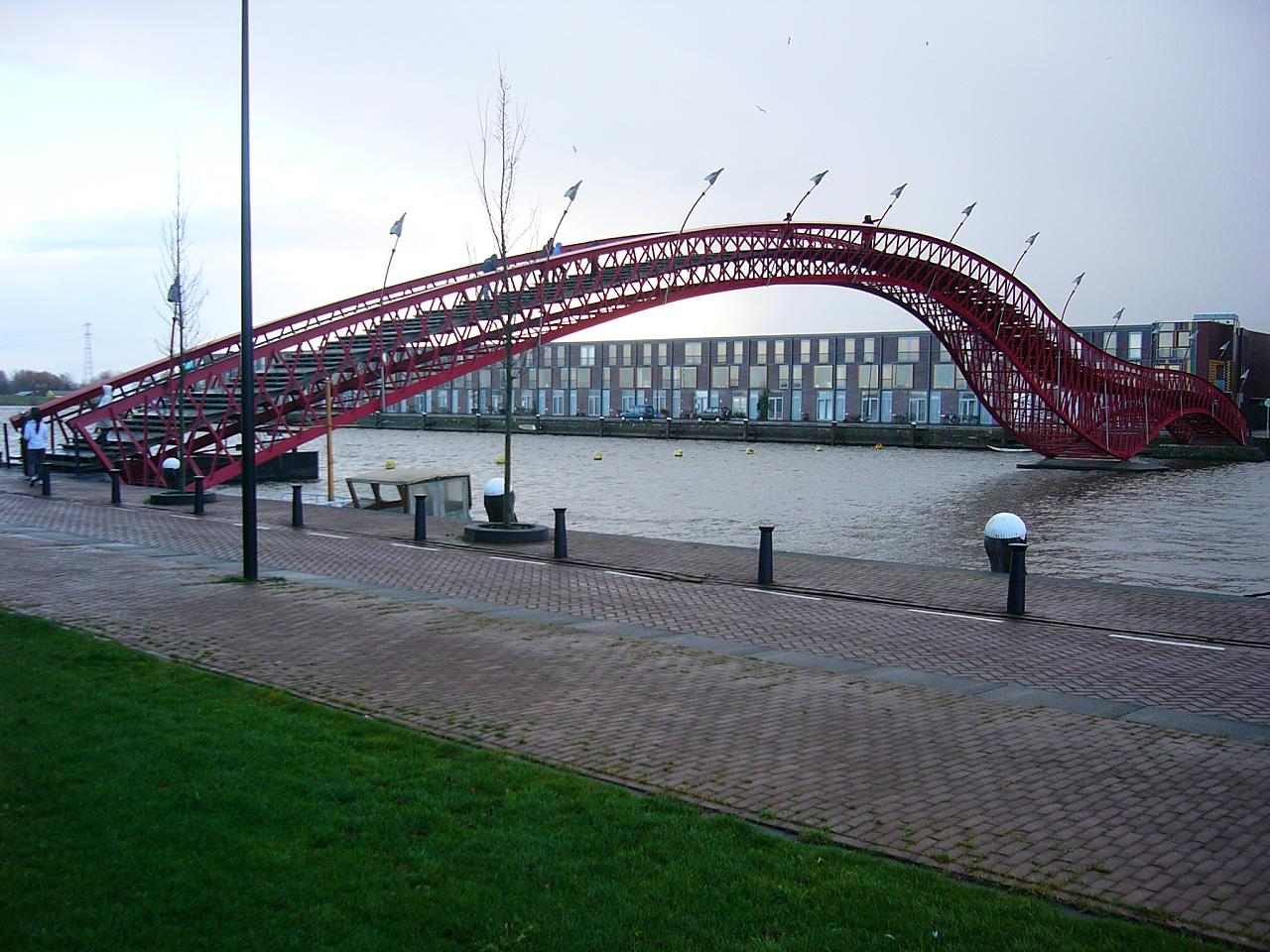
The Borneo Sporenburg Bridge designed by West 8.

West 8 is an urban planning and landscape architecture firm founded by Adriaan Geuze and Paul van Beek in Rotterdam, Netherlands in 1987. It is known for its contemporary designs and innovative solutions to urban planning problems using lighting, metal structures, and color. Van Beek is no longer part of the firm.

Geuze founded West 8 in 1987 in Rotterdam with Paul van Beek, who later left the firm. Geuze won the Dutch Maaskant Award for young architects in 1987 and the firm grew to employ more than 75 architects and planners, with offices in Rotterdam and New York City. The firm has produced several striking designs and is part of a wave of Dutch architects doing major works that have received international attention and recognition for novel design approaches.

== Background ==
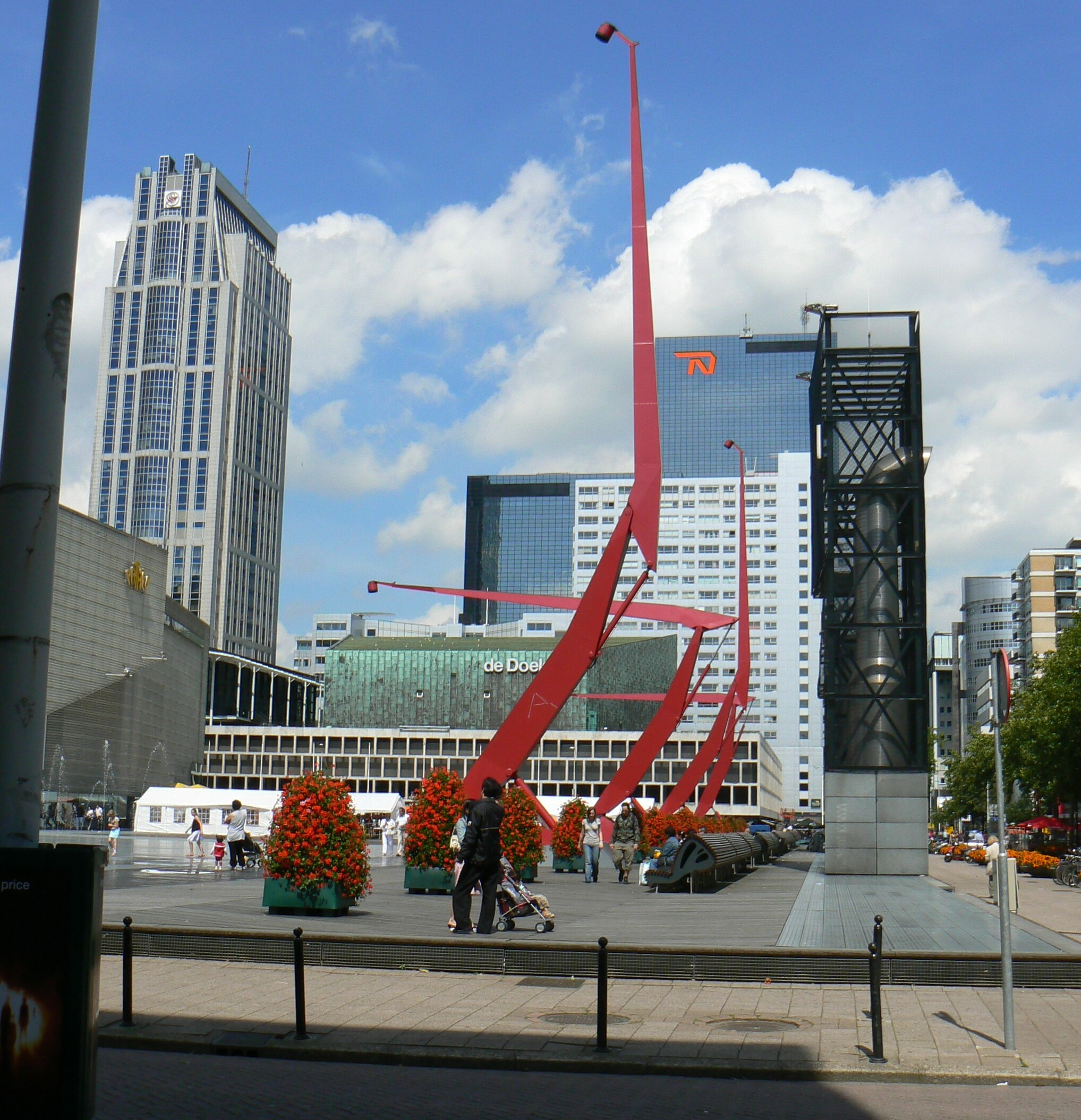
Schouwburgplein, Rotterdam

Geuze was born in Dordrecht in 1960 and graduated with a degree in landscape architecture from the University of Wageningen in 1987. Geuze's 1993 essay "Accelerating Darwin" advocated a "sensation of spontaneous culture which the city dweller creates". One of the firm's best known projects is the Schouwburgplein in Rotterdam (1996) using a raised platform lit from below and incorporating crane like structure to support lights that can be moved by inserting coins in a slot, "literally empowering the individual to light the square as they see fit." At the Oosterscheldedam Flood Barrier (1994) the firm used black and white striped mussel shells as art and landscape, and at the Carrascoplein in Amsterdam (1998) they converted a "forgotten place" beneath viaducts into a parking lot of abstract patterns with patches of green space with illumination of the viaduct soffits creating a "Ballardian urban park." West 8 developed masterplans for the Ypenburg Vinex showing that they can "marshal large plots and world-class architects with assurance", and produced a provocative design with palm trees in the sky plan for Arroyo Parkway, Pasadena, in 2002, and won a 2003 competition for an urban plan in Tromsø, Norway. West 8 became known in Europe for their ecological spatial planning and landscape projects. Ahead of time, their approach based on the environment reality was awarded a Global Award for Sustainable Architecture in 2014.

== Projects ==
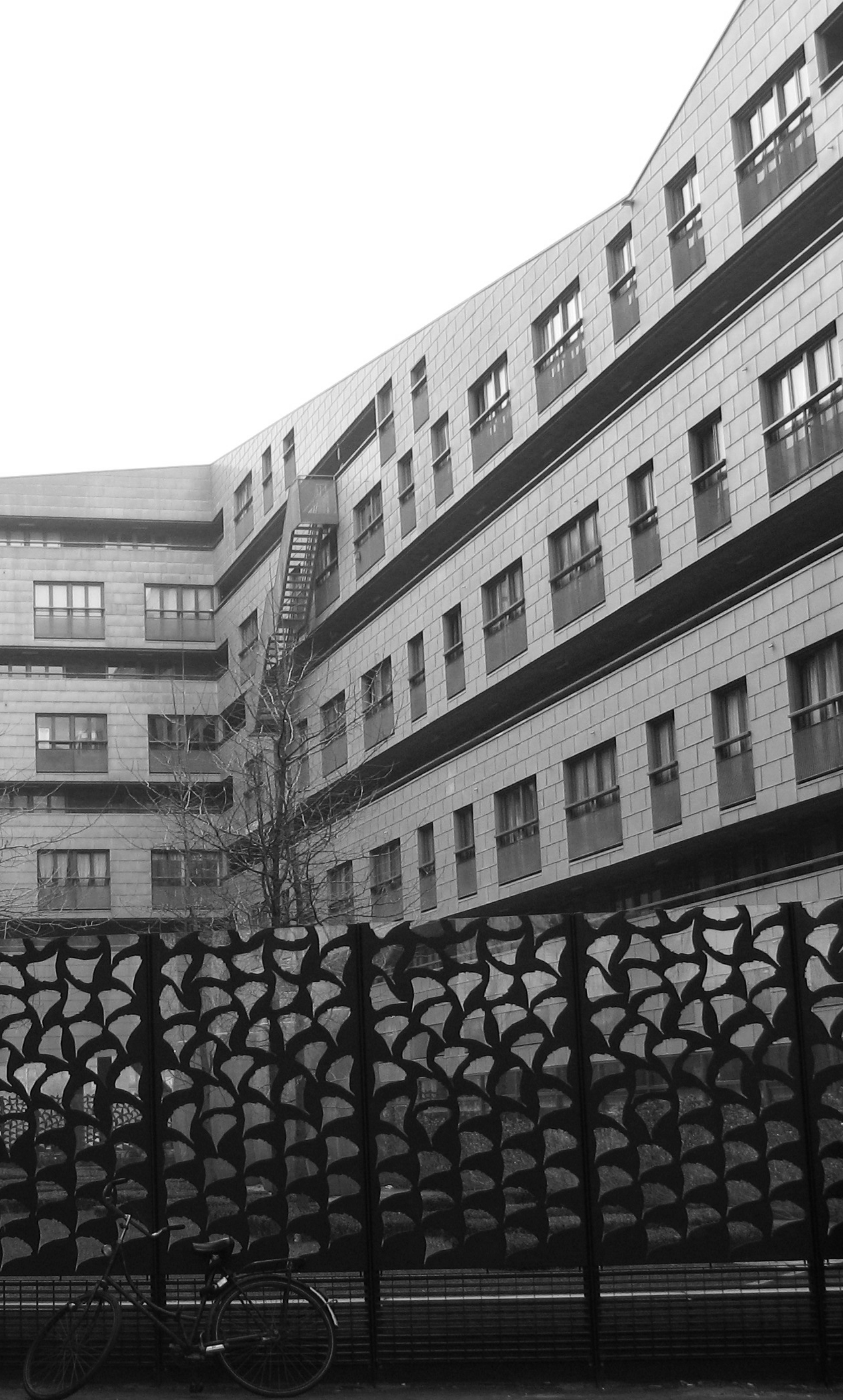
The Whale housing project

West 8's urban planning projects include striking new conceptions, such as the Schouwburgplein in Rotterdam, a large public square made of a lightweight metal structure which "floats" on top of the roof of a parking garage. Geuze has been credited with having "almost single-handedly re-established landscape on the agenda of Dutch urbanism and is now taking his influence global in designing open spaces in or around buildings by most of the best Dutch contemporary architects." West 8 brings landscape architecture into city planning in a functionalist and pragmatic way; since the distinction between town and country in places like the Netherlands has largely disappeared, novel ideas for landscape use are often called for by city planners to fulfill the needs of modern urbanites.

In the Netherlands, they are responsible for masterplanning a large-scale low-rise residential development on two peninsulas comprising the formerly dilapidated Borneo Sporenburg, part of the eastern harbor area of Amsterdam, as well as for the bicycle bridges and footbridges leading to the area. This development has received the Veronica Rudge Green Prize in Urban Design from Harvard University's Graduate School of Design in 2002.

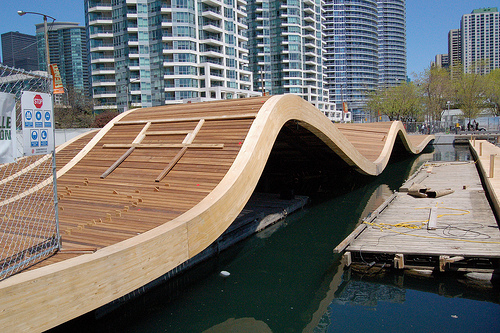
The Simcoe wavedeck nearing completion on Toronto's waterfront

West 8 have produced several highly original bridges designs for bridges including the so-called "Reptile Bridge" proposal for a connection between Leidsche Rijn and Utrecht, and the helical truss Vlaardingse Vaart Bridge in Vlaardingen, a finalist for the Dutch Design Awards in 2009. Their design for a pedestrian bridge in Amsterdam was nominated for the 2001 Design Prize of the city of Rotterdam. Most recently, they won a design competition for a bridge across a railroad in Aarschot, Belgium.

Undulating wave shapes are also part of West 8's designs, with DTAH, for a series of wavedecks on Toronto's waterfront. The wooden-planked walkways are part of a redevelopment project overseen by Waterfront Toronto. The first three of the four planned wavedecks (Rees wavedeck, Spadina wavedeck, and Simcoe wavedeck) have been completed.

In the United States, West 8 have gained a reputation for unorthodox design proposals, such as their proposal to fill in the World Trade Center site and turn it into a pasture. They were finalists for the design of the new exterior for the New York Aquarium, and were part of the team of firms that won the design contest for an ambitious 40-acre (160,000 m^{2}) park (including free bicycles) on the southern half of Governors Island in New York.

A list of projects includes:

- Schouwburgplein (Rotterdam) public square
- The Whale housing project
- Sporenburg Bicycle Bridge
- Four wavedecks on Toronto (Ontario)'s waterfront
- Governors Island (New York) redevelopment
- Madrid Río (Madrid, Spain, along with architects Ginés Garrido (of Burgos & Garrido), Porras La Casta, and Rubio & Álvarez-Sala. This project received the Veronica Rudge Green Prize in Urban Design in 2015 - the second time West 8 has received this award.
