= Veronica Rudge Green Prize in Urban Design =

Architecture and urban design award

The Veronica Rudge Green Prize in Urban Design is a biannual award that acknowledges remarkable urban design projects that include multiple buildings or an open space, improve the quality of urban life, and have a humane and beneficial impact. It is awarded by Harvard University's Graduate School of Design (Mass., U.S.A.) and was founded in 1986 to mark the 350th anniversary of Harvard University and the 50th anniversary of the Graduate School of Design.

The award has been cited as the world's most important for urban planning. It comes with a prize of $50,000 (in 2017). Among its unique particularities, is that its jury members visit finalist projects in person.

== Recipient projects ==
- 2023: Grand Paris Express (Paris, France). Société du Grand Paris
- 2017: High Line (New York City, New York). Friends of the High Line, designed by James Corner Field Operations, Diller Scofidio + Renfro, and Piet Oudolf
- 2015: Madrid Río (Madrid, Spain). Ginés Garrido (of Burgos & Garrido), Porras La Casta, Rubio & Álvarez-Sala, and West 8
- 2013:
  - Metro do Porto (Porto, Portugal). Eduardo Souto de Moura with the Metro do Porto
  - Northeastern Urban Integration Project (Medellín, Colombia). City of Medellín with Alejandro Echeverri and the Empresa de Desarrollo Urbano agency
- 2010: Cheonggyecheon Restoration Project (Seoul, South Korea). Seoul Metropolitan Government
- 2007: Olympic Sculpture Park (Seattle, Washington). Weiss/Manfredi
- 2005: Rehabilitation of the Old City of Aleppo (Aleppo, Syria). City of Aleppo
- 2002: Borneo Sporenburg Residential Waterfront (Amsterdam, Netherlands). Adriaan Geuze/West 8
- 2000: Favela-Bairro Project (Rio de Janeiro, Brazil). Jorge Mario Jáuregui
- 1998:
  - Bilbao Metro (Bilbao, Spain). Foster and Partners
  - Carré d'Art (Nîmes, France). Foster and Partners
- 1996:
  - Historic Center (Mexico City, Mexico)
  - Xochimilco District (Mexico City, Mexico). Mexico City
- 1993:
  - Hillside Terrace Complex (Tokyo, Japan). Fumihiko Maki
  - Monte Carasso Master Plan (Monte Carasso, Switzerland). Luigi Snozzi
- 1990: Urban Public Spaces (Barcelona, Spain). City of Barcelona
- 1988:
  - Byker Redevelopment (Newcastle, England). Ralph Erskine
  - Malagueira Quarter Housing Project (Évora, Portugal). Álvaro Siza Vieira
