= KNSM Island =

- Neighborhood of Amsterdam
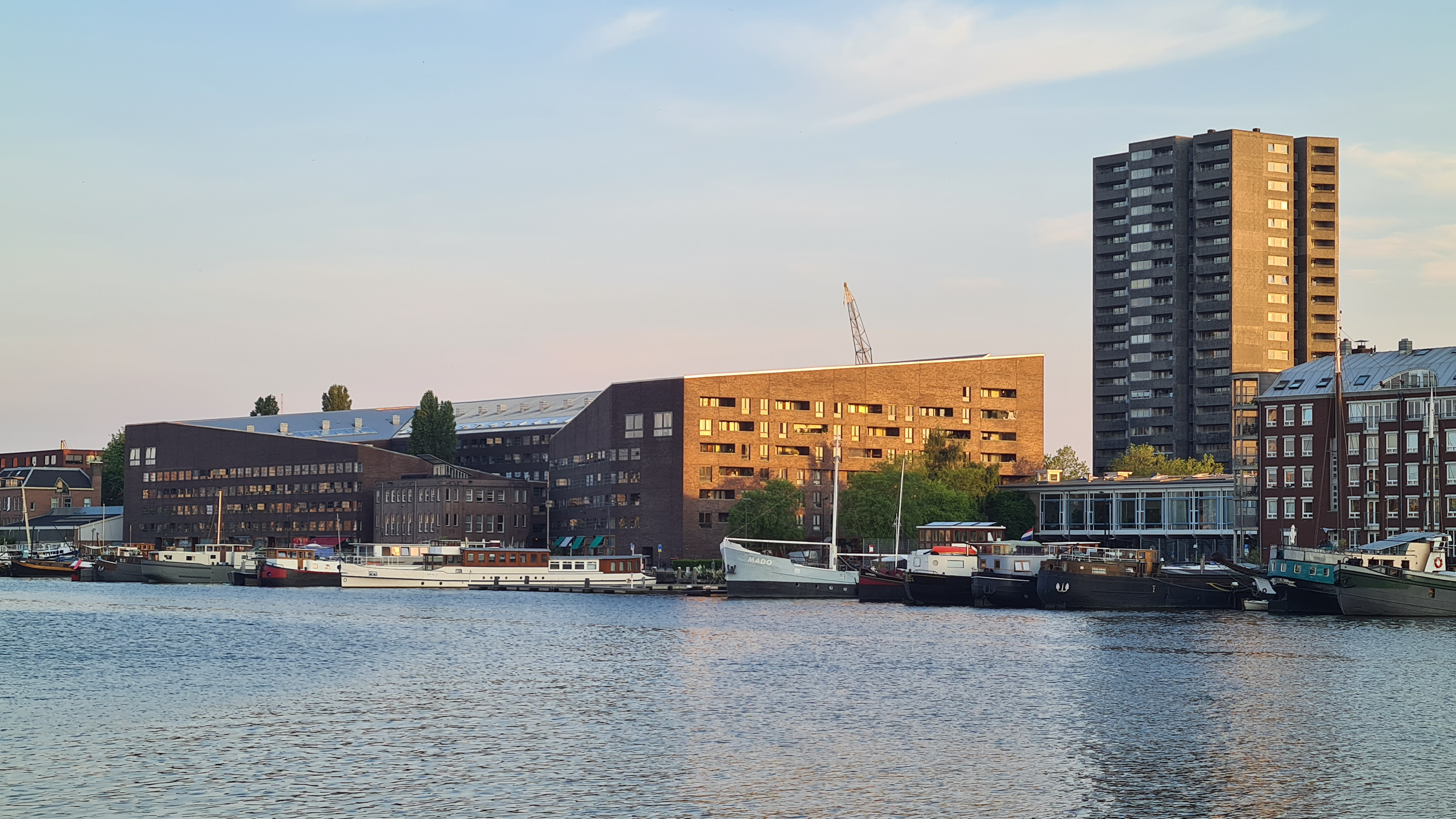
- KNSM Island as seen from Sporenburg: Left: Piraeus, right: Skydome & Albert
- Interactive map of KNSM Island
- Coordinates: 52°22′37″N 4°56′34″E
- Country: Netherlands
- City: Amsterdam
- Constructed: 1903
- Named for: Koninklijke Nederlandsche Stoomboot Maatschappij (KNSM)
- Website: http://www.buurt-online.nl/amsterdam/knsmeiland/

The KNSM Island is a man-made island in the Eastern Docklands of Amsterdam. KNSM stands for the Koninklijke Nederlandsche Stoomboot-Maatschappij, the Royal Dutch Steamboat Shipping company which used to have its headquarters and its docks on the island. It is now a large residential area containing modern architecture with a mostly well-off population.

== History ==
Originally the island was a breakwater for the Oostelijke Handelskade, just like the adjacent Java Island. The islands level was later raised with soil dredged from the North Sea Canal, creating a harbor. In 1903, the KNSM occupied this harbor terrain that covered most of the island. In 1956 the KNSM celebrated its centennial, but the decolonization of the Dutch East Indies and the growth of cargo transport marked the end of the company. KNSM moved parts of its operations to the Western Docklands of Amsterdam and ceased others, finally leaving the island in 1977. In 1981 it merged with other major shipping companies to become Nedlloyd. During the 1980s, squatters, artists, and urban nomads occupied the area. In the 1990s, groups occupying what had come to be known as "sloaps" ("sites left over after [or before] planning") who were originally tolerated by the municipality were slowly ordered to leave.

== Redevelopment ==
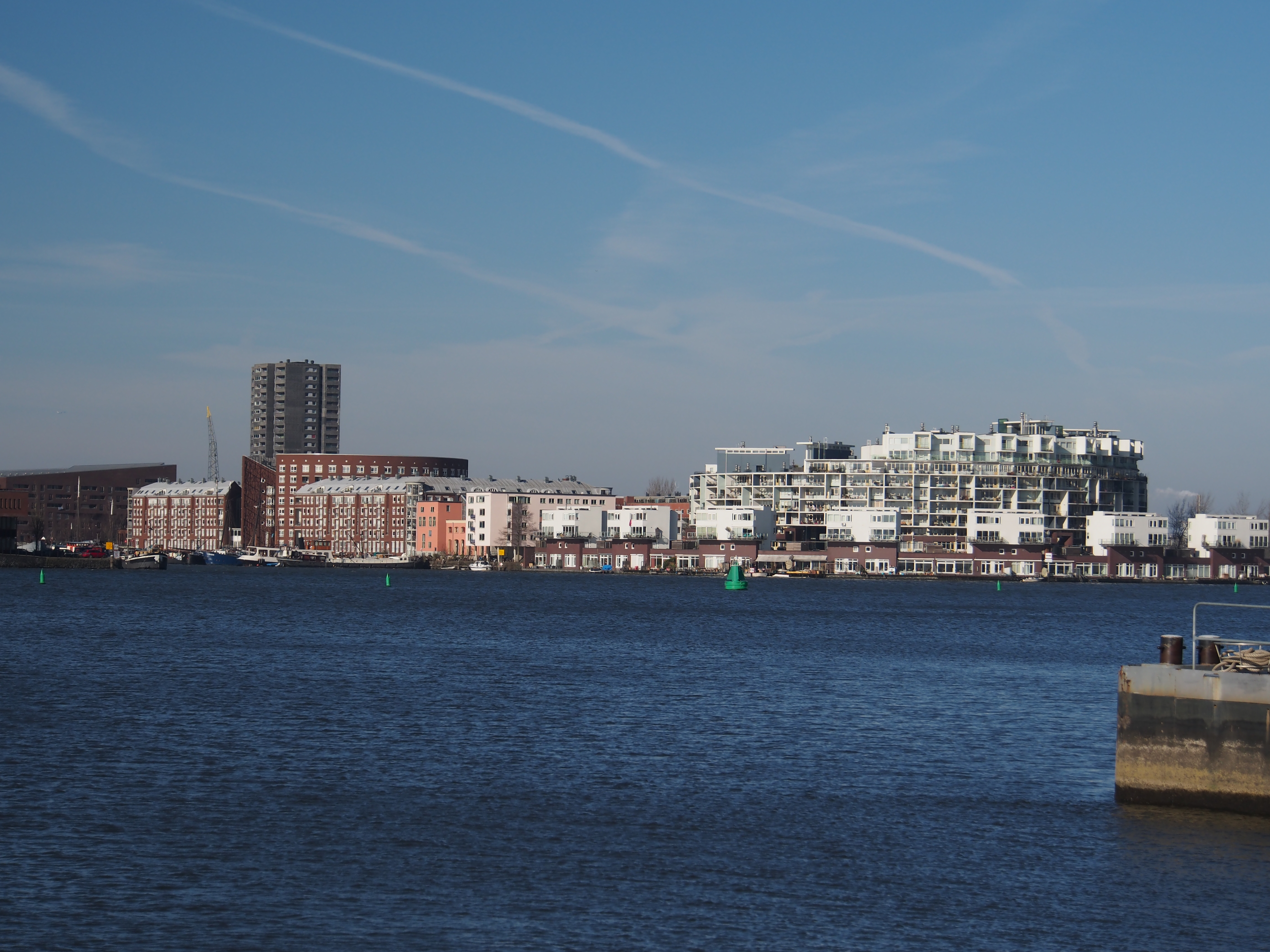
KNSM Island as seen from Zeeburgereiland. Left: Piraeus, Skydome & Albert, right: Emerald Empire

In the 1990s the entire area was reshaped into a housing area, based on a 1988 blueprint by Jo Coenen, his first big project. He envisioned a mixed use of the space, and planned "super blocks," big buildings containing individual homes and apartments along a central avenue, mimicking the organization of the island's former warehouses and storage buildings. The redevelopment of the island was part of a masterplan for turning the entire Eastern Docklands into modern residential areas to allow for the expansion of the city. Many of the old buildings on the KNSM Island have been preserved by order of the city. The structures of the old cafeteria, the houses of the medical doctors, a storage building ("Loods 6"), a customs building, and the office of the Rijn Scheepvaart Maatschappij still remain. Original plans initially called for an exclusive neighborhood of home owners, but the city mandated a significant portion of the homes to be built as rentals in order to attract a more diverse population. Still, the island is known as a place for yuppies; the English paper The Telegraph called it "Dockland chic."

Loods 6, a building typifying 1950s design and architecture currently contains artists' work spaces, a gallery, and an art exchange also houses an exposition dedicated to the island's history. The former company park, built in 1956, was preserved and restored in 1994 with the help of original designer Mien Ruys; and was renamed in her honor to Mien Ruysplantsoen.

=== Accessibility ===
The Azartplein links the KNSM Island to the Java Island, and is the final stop of tram line 7.

=== New buildings on the island ===
- Emerald Empire, by Jo Coenen.
- Piraeus, by German architects Hans Kollhoff and Christian Rapp (1989–1994). 304 homes in 150 different types, 95% of which low-income housing.
- Albert or Barcelona, by Belgian architect Bruno Albert, with a metal fence by Belgian artist Narcisse Tordoir.
- Skydome, a twenty-story apartment building by Wiel Arets.
- Hoogkade & Hoogwerf, by Swiss architectural firm Diener & Diener.

=== Amphitrite ===
When the KNSM celebrated its centennial, in 1959, the employees donated a group of sculptures and a fountain, dedicated to Amphitrite and made by Dutch/Flemish sculptor Albert Termote. The sculptures had to be moved to make way for housing in 1981 and were removed to the Oosterdok, near the Nederlands Scheepvaartmuseum. In 2009 they returned to the island in the Azartplein.
