= Java-eiland =

Neighbourhood of Amsterdam

Coordinates: 52°22′38″N 4°56′12″E

- Neighbourhood of Amsterdam
- Interactive map of Java-eiland
- Country: Netherlands
- Province: North Holland
- COROP: Amsterdam
- Time zone: UTC+1 (CET)

Java-eiland (literally, "Java Island") is a neighbourhood of Amsterdam, Netherlands. It is located on a peninsula, surrounded on three sides by water and on the east by the KNSM Island neighbourhood.

== History ==
Amsterdam Eastern Docklands neighborhood map

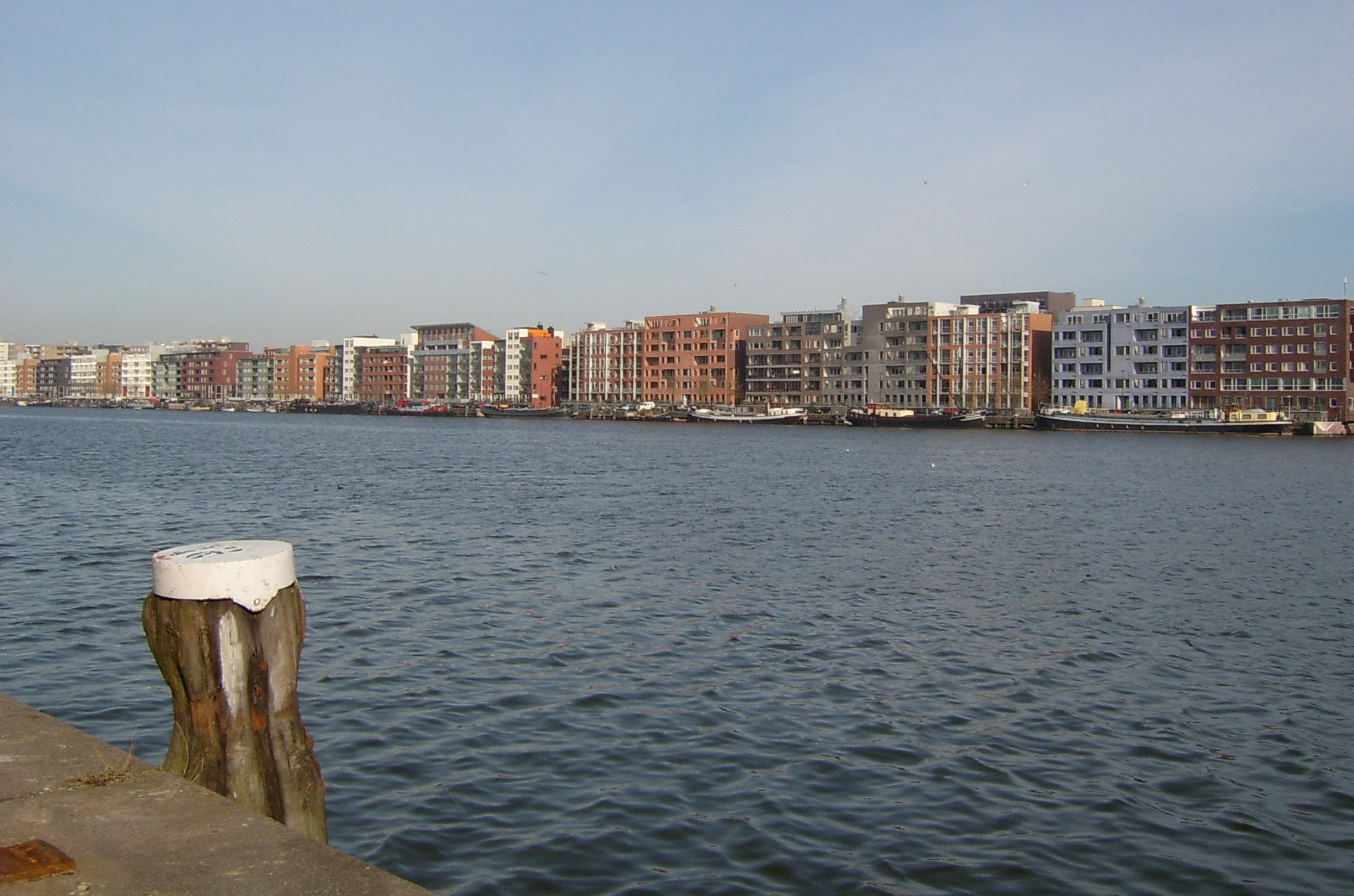
Java-eiland as seen from the Oostelijke Handelskade

The peninsula was created by dredging water at the end of the 19th century and was used for shipping services. The Stoomvaart Maatschappij Nederland was located here which ran services to the Dutch East Indies, particularly to the island of Java. After the Second World War and the independence of Indonesia, trade nearly came to a standstill. In the 1980s, squatters, artists and the homeless had taken over many of the buildings in the area. The name "Java Island" was given to the area when it was designated for housing in the 1990s.

In the 1990s the area was transformed into residential units according to a master plan by Amsterdam architect Sjoerd Soeters. Except for one building owned by port authorities, all the old buildings were razed. As for transport, tram line 7 terminates at Azartplein (Azart Square), on the eastern edge of Java-eiland.

Notable architecture includes four small canals with post-modernist canal houses from various architects, cycle and pedestrian bridges by Guy Rombouts and Monica Droste, and at the Azartplein two building by the Swiss architectural firm Diener & Diener.

The neighbourhood is slated to be the future home of a national museum on slavery, which is to be opened in 2030. David Brandwagt, a worker for the municipality of Amsterdam, stating that Java-eiland was chosen as the location due to the public's desire that it was important for the museum to be near water, as well as have room for a park and to be in a prominent and central location but is still accessible.
