= Madrid Río =

Urban park in Madrid, Spain

Coordinates: 40°23′55″N 3°42′42″W

Madrid Río Park
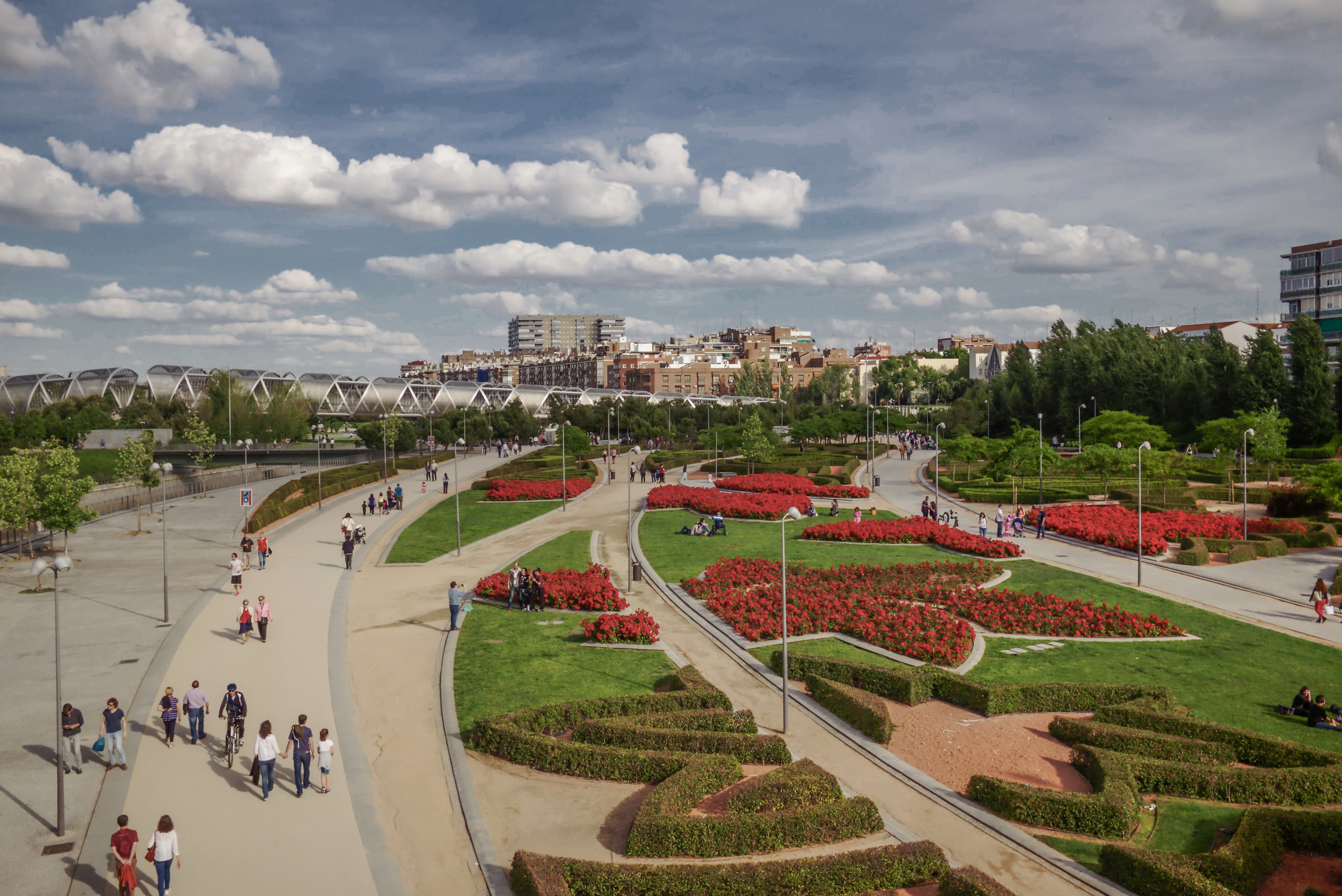
- Location: Madrid, Spain
- Operated by: Ayuntamiento de Madrid
- Status: Public park

Madrid Río is an urban park in the Spanish capital Madrid, built along an urban stretch of the Manzanares River following the burial of the M-30 bypass road in this area. It is the result of a project led by the architect Ginés Garrido, who won the international ideas competition organised by the Madrid City Council in 2005 to redevelop the area.

The project started with the idea of recovering the banks of the Manzanares River for the use and enjoyment of the citizens. The section of the river that is now known as Madrid Río is the section that was boxed in by the M-30 bypass road, a road that isolated the river between the two directions of the highway as well as creating a barrier and fracture between the two sides of the city, the district of Arganzuela on the left bank, and the districts of Latina, Carabanchel and Usera on the right bank. The connection of the M-30 with the A-5 motorway, the road to Extremadura, separated the city in an impassable way from Casa de Campo, Madrid's largest park. The project involved the undergrounding of the M-30 in this area as well as that section of the A-5 running parallel to Casa de Campo.

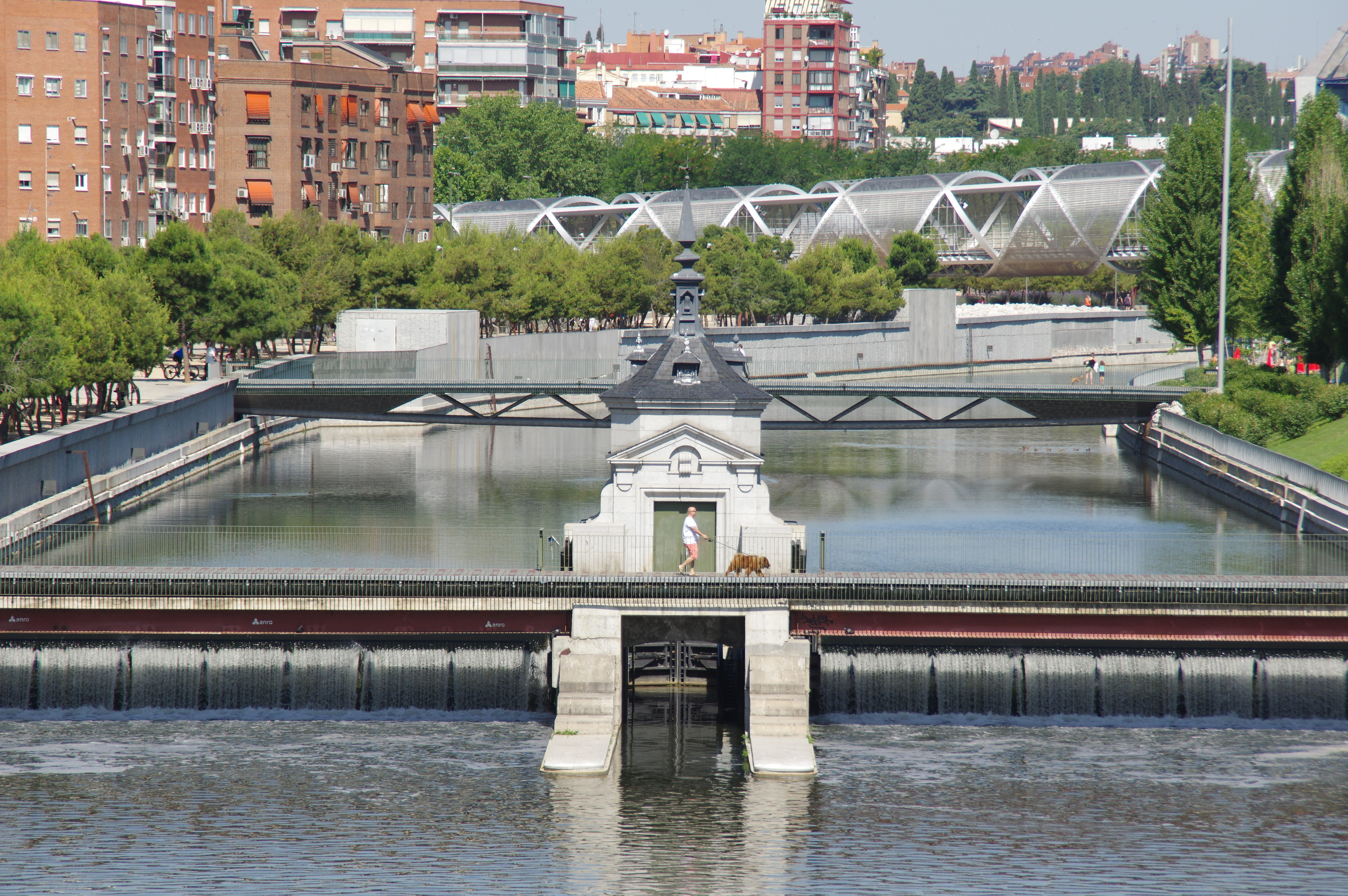
Dam nº 8, to which a pedestrian footbridge has been added to cross the Manzanares River.

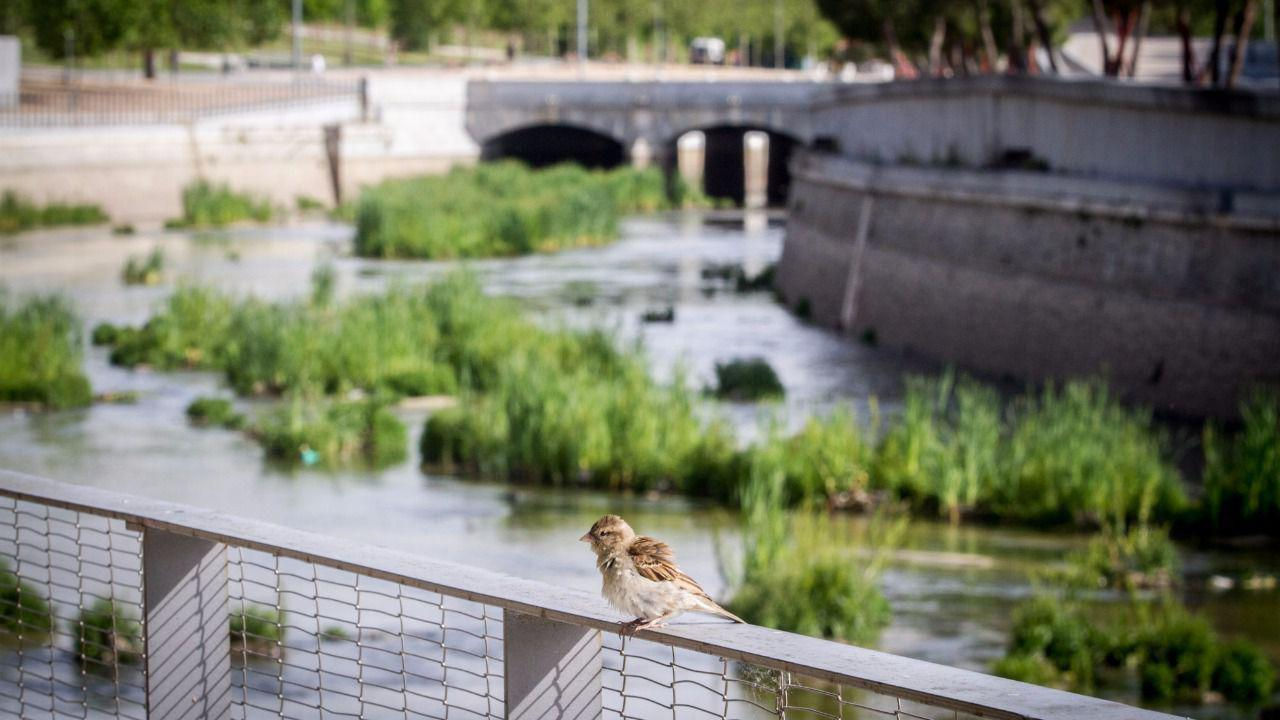
The results of rewilding.

There are seven dams that regulate the river as it passes through the city. They receive the waters of the Manzanares River after passing through the Santillana reservoir, in Manzanares el Real, and the El Pardo reservoir, in the municipality of Madrid, which is why they are numbered from 3 to 9. Their mechanisms and locks have been repaired and the dams have been used for the new system of crossings. Initially, the project for the renaturation of the Manzanares River as it passes through Madrid Río contemplated the opening of all the dams, except the last one, to create the conditions that would make it possible for the Madrid Río rowing school to train, but finally, contrary to what was first agreed and due to pressure from the local residents, it was also decided to also open the last one so that the river could flow freely.

The water level has been dropped as the natural flow of the river has been restored. Accessible wooden boards and fish ladders have been added to encourage the continuity of the underwater fauna along the river. There has been a noticeable improvement in avian biodiversity along the river with herons and kingfishers being regular visitors.

The Madrid Río has received the Veronica Rudge Green Prize in Urban Design from Harvard University's Graduate School of Design in 2015. The architects were Ginés Garrido (of Burgos & Garrido), Porras La Casta, Rubio & Álvarez-Sala, and West 8.
