= Koninklijke Nederlandse Stoomboot-Maatschappij =

Transport company in Netherlands

- House flag
- Industry: Shipping company
- Founded: 1 October 1856
- Defunct: 1981 merged into Nedlloyd
- Successor: Nederlandsche Scheepvaart Unie
- Headquarters: Amsterdam, Netherlands
- Area served: Europe, Caribbean and Central America

The Koninklijke Nederlandse Stoomboot-Maatschappij (KNSM; Royal Netherlands Steamship Company) was an Amsterdam-based shipping company that existed from 1856 to 1981. It was once the largest company in Amsterdam and one of the top five shipping lines in the Netherlands. The company operated mid-sized cargo ships that had limited passenger accommodations. At its peak in 1939, the company had 79 vessels. Of these, 48 were lost in World War II.

== Context (1827–1856) ==
=== Economical and technical developments ===
In 1827 the Amsterdamsche Stoomboot Maatschappij (ASM) had tried to establish a steamship line from Amsterdam to London, but the line proved economically unviable. A few decades later, the general economic circumstances had changed: In 1846, the Corn Laws had been cancelled. It was also known that the Navigation Acts would be cancelled in 1849. Furthermore, the railroad from Amsterdam had finally reached the Rhine.

Also in the 1840s, some technological innovations changed the conditions for steam navigation. In the Netherlands, iron hulls were introduced for sailing ships when L. Smit en Zoon launched the iron schooner Industrie in 1847. The screw as a means of propelling ships also broke through in the 1840s. Both developments meant that an iron screw ship could transport much more cargo than a paddle steamer of the same size. Furthermore, the screw steamship was a much better sailing ship than the paddle steamer.

All this meant that a lot more goods became eligible for profitable transport by steamships. In the Netherlands the Stoomschroefschooner Reederij (Steam screw schooner line) was founded in the late 1840s. The British St Petersburg Steamship Company opened a line between London and Amsterdam in October 1847, and these were not all.

=== The Amsterdam Harburger Stoomboot Maatschappij ===
On 31 March 1854 the Amsterdam-Harburger Stoomboot Maatschappij (Amsterdam Harburg Steamship Company) was founded by C.W.J. Ramann and C.A. Müller. This company bought two steamships, which sailed from Amsterdam to Harburg in the Kingdom of Hanover and Altona in (Danish) Holstein. The Harburg company had a share capital of 185,600 guilders. Due to fierce competition with the ASM and other problems, the Harburg company lost about 50,000 guilders in its first two years of operation. In order to prevent the sale of the Harburg company's ships, Paul van Vlissingen bought new shares for 100,000 guilders and took control of the company.

== History ==
=== Foundation of the Koninklijke Nederlandse Stoomboot-Maatschappij ===
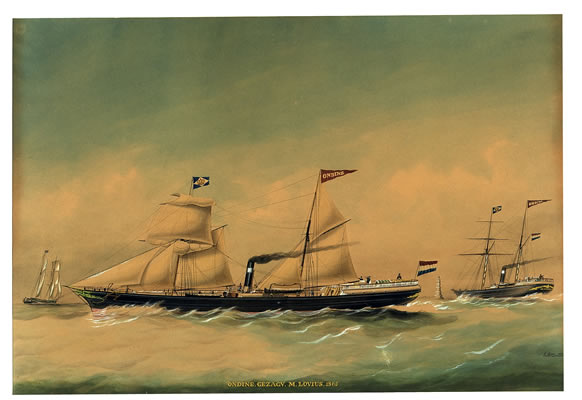
Ondine

In April 1856 a committee of influential people announced their intention to found a public company for steam navigation. The company would have to open lines from Amsterdam to Saint Petersburg, Bordeaux and Königsberg. The supervisory board would consist of: Frederic van der Oudermeulen of the Senate; H. Croockewit of De Nederlandsche Bank; J. van Heukelom (Stadnitski & van Heukelom); R.J. Schimmelpenninck (municipality of Amsterdam); and H. Willink (Simon Thomas & Willink). The Directors would be: C.A. von Hemert (Alstorphius & von Hemert); W. Ramann; and C.A. Müller (both of the Harburg company). The share capital of the Koninklijke Nederlandse Stoomboot-Maatschappij was to consist of 2,000,000 guilders in shares of 1,000 guilders each. By early July 1856 800,000 guilders of shares had been sold, and the company was constituted. By then M.H. Insinger had joined the directors, and C.A. Müller had stepped back to become only a deputy director. The new company immediately got the label koninklijk (royal), probably due to the influence of Prince Henry.

On 1 October 1856 the contract for the foundation of the KNSM was finalized. The first list of shareholders shows that 813,000 guilders worth of shares were sold. It also shows that the Amsterdam merchants were rather reluctant to participate.

=== Start of operations ===
The KNSM appointed several agents in the harbors were her ships were destined: Fauré Frères in Bordeaux; Fiedler & Co. in Copenhagen; Schröder en Co. in Riga; R. Kleyenstüber in Königsberg; and Kapherr in Saint Petersburg. In Amsterdam 8 companies were appointed as cargadoors (Cargo broker?). In order to start operations as quickly as possible, KNSM hired the English steamer Auguste Louise in June, and the West Friesland from Kampen in August 1856. Both ships led to some losses.

Just after the Crimean War (1853 - March 1856) steamships were still very expensive. However, in August 1856 KNSM succeeded in buying the small iron screw vessel Nina for 8,500 GBP, or about 102,000 guilders. She had 300 tons cargo capacity, could accommodate 30 passengers and had a speed of 11 knots. She was renamed Ondine, and would ply the route to Bordeaux. Four more ships were ordered at William Denny and Brothers in Dumbarton, Scotland. These were three screw ships of 450 ton capacity and 10 feet draft for 37,894 GBP total, and one ship of 300 ton for 9,500 GBP.

The three 450 ton ships were named Berenice, Willem III and Anna Paulowna. The 300 ton vessel was named Rembrandt. A sixth vessel, the 300 ton Urania was ordered at Earle's Shipbuilding in Hull. Two barges were bought for (un)loading the ships, for which there were no quays in Amsterdam. In the Spring of 1857 the vessels built in Dumbarton were delivered.

In the Baltic, the KNSM came to an agreement with the ASM about shipping to Saint Petersburg in November 1857. KNSM then also started to sail to the Mediterranean. 1857 ended with a positive result of about 70,000 guilders. A mishap was that the Willem III was sunk in a collision with the French steamer Normandie in December 1857. The French courts ruled in favor of the KNSM, and the owners of the Normandie than abandoned her to the KNSM. She proved a good ship with 700 ton capacity and 180 hp engines, and was renamed Willem III. Even while freight prices were low, KNSM made solid profits in 1858 and 1859.

The Amsterdam Harburger Stoomboot Maatschappij was in big trouble by late 1859. Its management then made an attempt to restructure it by exchanging debt for shares. However, KNSM succeeded in buying so much of its debts, that it could thwart these plans. It next bought the Königin Maria of 300 ton for 33,000 guilders, and the George V of 200 ton for 28,000 guilders. However, both required serious repairs. Königin Maria was renamed Medea. The Van Vlissingen en Dudok van Heel shipyard then lengthened George V by 22 feet, and she was renamed Rubbens. Another major asset of the Harburg company was a building on the pier before the West-Indische Huis in the Oosterdok. KNSM bought it for 80,000 guilders, and so got a covered quay, where her ships could discharge without transloading on barges, like the competition had to do.

1862 was a bad year. Freight prices were very low. The Cycloop (ex-Charles l'Marc) was lost in the Baltic. She was replaced by buying the 800 ton Bonita, which was bought in Liverpool, and renamed Cycloop. Meanwhile, the Irene of 1,000 ton was ordered in Dumbarton for 22,000 GBP (264,000 guilders). These transactions were made possible by placing almost 500,000 guilders of 5% bonds. In 1863 KNSM and ASM came to another agreement. KNSM would not sail to Hamburg, and ASM would not sail directly to Stettin. The line to Königsberg would be shared. The next few years were very profitable.

=== Merger with De Maas ===
The Rotterdamsche Stoomboot Reederij De Maas had also been founded in 1856. It had a share capital of 682,500 guilders and four steamships sailing to Marseille, Bristol and Cardiff. It had been a successful company, paying an average dividend of over 4.5%. However, in the Mediterranean it felt the competition of the KNSM. De Maas also lacked some of the advantages that larger shipping companies enjoyed. One of these was the ability to exchange ships, so the company could both provide a specific service and could employ most of its ships where they were most profitable.

KNSM therefore thought of merging with De Maas. This would also give KNSM the benefit of using the harbor of Rotterdam, especially for the trade with England. The KNSM therefore proposed to buy De Maas for 500,000 guilders in new KNSM shares. One director, and three supervisors from Rotterdam would join the board of KNSM. In 1865 the deal succeeded.

=== Further expansion ===
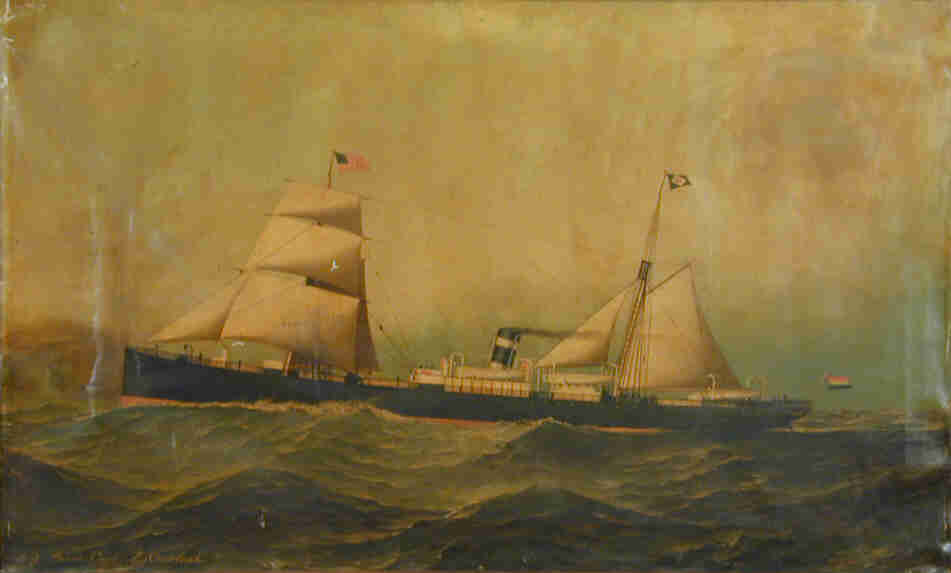
1881 painting of Jason

The merger with De Maas proved very successful. The bigger ships were especially successful. In her first two years of operation Irene, which had cost 264,000 guilders, earned 71,000 guilders and 73,000 guilders. It led to placing more shares, and to the order for Jason, a ship even bigger than Irene. In 1867 KNSM organized the foundation of the Amsterdamsche Rijn Stoomvaart Maatschappij. The idea was to improve the connections from Amsterdam to Germany and further up the Rhine.

In January 1867 the board proposed to place new bonds, expanding the company's debt from 250,000 to 500,000 guilders. The justification was that KNSM needed new ships, and these could now be bought cheaply, because too many had been built. The bonds were indeed used to acquire Orion of 800 ton and Astrea of 700 ton from a failing English shipping company. After this transaction, the only change in the fleet was the disappearance of Rubbens, which sank near Jutland in 1869. Even with this expansion of its fleet, the KNSM often had to charter other ships in order to handle the cargo that it was to transport.

== Failed attempt to found a Transatlantic Line (1869–1882) ==
=== Context ===
While Dutch steam navigation soundly developed after 1850, this did not apply to steam navigation across the Atlantic. Here British and German companies expanded and made excellent profits, while Dutch exports to North America declined by 31% from 1857 to 1867. This was especially true for migrants to North America, who no longer travelled via Rotterdam, but chose to travel via Hamburg and Bremen.

In 1869 the navy officer Marin Henry Jansen brought the Transatlantic trade situation to the public attention in a brochure. He noted that the Netherlands had only a small part of the Transatlantic trade, even while the big rivers made the country very suitable for this trade. Jansen wanted to establish a line from Vlissingen (the best Dutch harbor at the time) to Norfolk, Virginia. The choice of Norfolk was due to the influence of Jansen's friend Matthew Fontaine Maury. Jansen proposed that the government would subsidize the line with 662.400 guilders a year.

Meanwhile, the Rotterdam shipping line owner Antoine Plate also started an initiative. This would later lead to the foundation of the Nederlandsch-Amerikaansche Stoomvaart Maatschappij (NASM), later Holland America Line. Plate thought that a subsidy was not necessary for the project.

=== Several initiatives for transatlantic shipping ===
In September 1869 the board of KNSM discussed the acquisition of four very large ships of almost 2,000 ton for the Mediterranean trade, and plans for Transatlantic shipping. It led to a plan to sell bonds for 5,000,000 guilders, which would have to be repaid in 25 years. In order to influence public opinion, the board published its views. The KNSM stated that the line would require ships so big that Amsterdam and Rotterdam could not be used as harbors. Vlissingen was preferable over Nieuwediep, but KNSM did not agree with the idea to sail to Norfolk instead of New York. KNSM also thought a state subsidy unnecessary.

In October 1869 Jansen presided a congress about transatlantic navigation in Utrecht. One of its goals was to establish a single company for this purpose. The attempt failed, mainly because the need for very large ships was not understood. KNSM then asked her shareholders for authorization to take up the 5,000,000 guilders loan. Four steamers for the Mediterranean would cost 1,550,000 and call at Nieuwediep. Three ocean liners would cost 2,225,000 and call at Vlissingen. The KNSM plan failed, because only about 2,000,000 guilders in bonds were sold. However, KNSM made good use of the money by ordering Castor, Pollux and Stella of about 1,800 ton each. Other ships were bought, lengthened, and given compound steam engines. It led to a powerful development of KNSM's Mediterranean trade.

In January 1870 M.H. Jansen applied to the finance ministry for a 10-year subsidy of 624,000 guilders a year for a steam line from Vlissingen to New York, which he would found. When this was declined, he went to the House of Representatives. In February 1871 this led to an initiative for law by several representatives. The proposal was defeated with 22 votes in favor, and 44 against. With it, KNSM had lost a problematic competitor for the investor's money.

=== KNSM's first attempt at transatlantic shipping ===
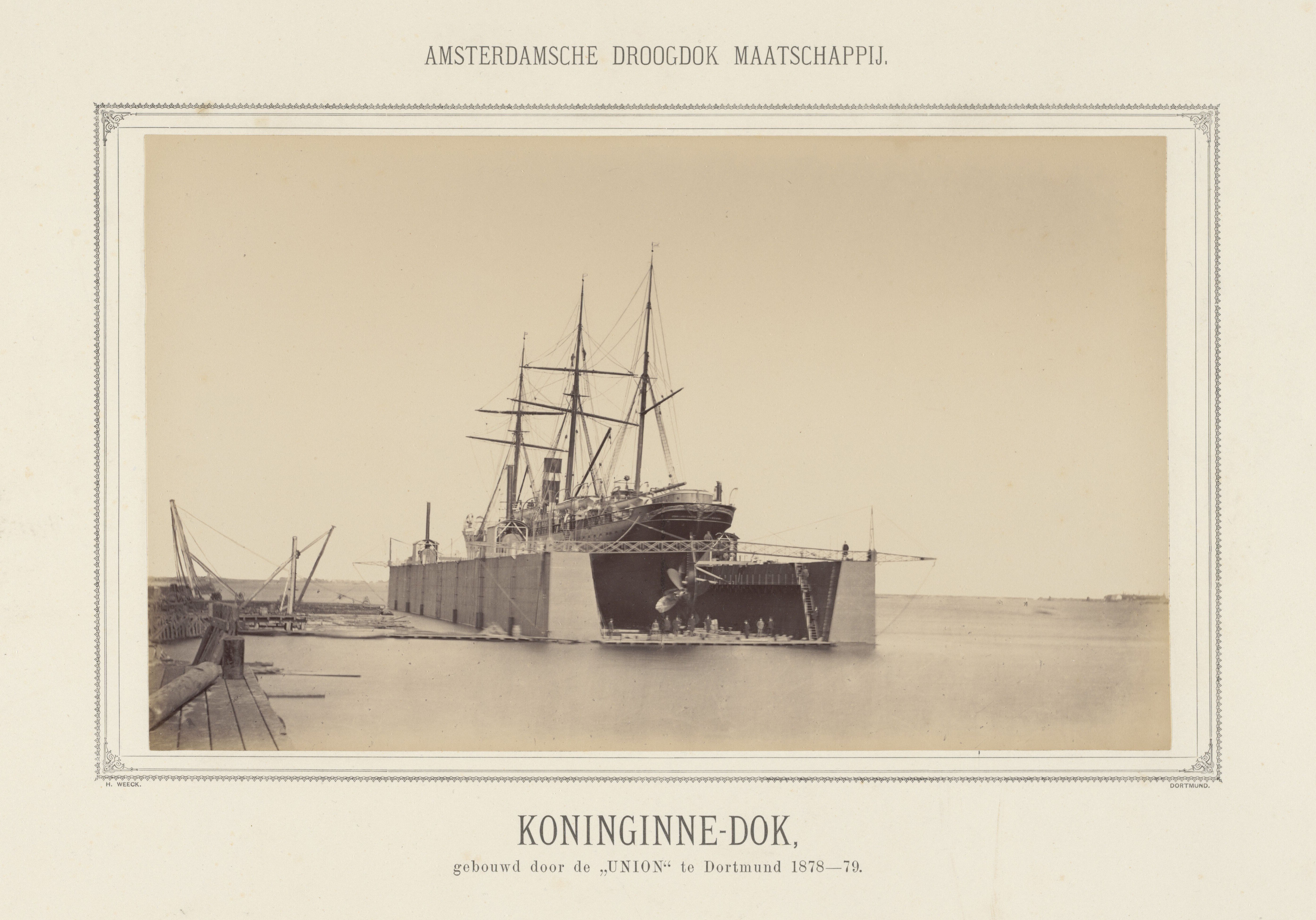
1879: Ocean liner Stad Amsterdam on Koninginnedok

In April 1873 the board of KNSM proposed to the shareholders to sell 3,000,000 guilders in shares, and to sell bonds for 2,000,000. With the money two ocean liners would be ordered. Meanwhile, the North Sea Canal was close to completion, so that after using Nieuwediep for a few years, the line could leave from Amsterdam. The proposal led to the sale of only 872 shares, and of only 1,189 bonds at 95%, but it was enough to order two 3,500 ton ships and 200 hp. These were the Stad Amsterdam and Stad Haarlem.

1873 was a good year for the KNSM. However, just when the ocean liners where getting ready, the big Panic of 1873 brought migrant traffic to the US to a halt. The situation was so bad that in February 1875 the KNSM board was authorized by the shareholders to not commission the new ocean liners. During the same meeting, the KNSM decided to get involved in founding the Stoomvaart Maatschappij Zeeland, which would have a very difficult start. Of its share capital, only 160,000 guilders were taken by the public, while Prince Henry and KSNM each took 320,000 guilders of shares.

The KNSM now experienced some very rough years. Apart from very low freights, many of her ships met with disasters that put them out of action for many months. Of the two ocean liners, Stad Amsterdam twice sailed to the East Indies, but proved unsuitable for the climate. Stad Haarlem was chartered for a trip to New Zealand, but that resulted in even more losses. On the other hand, the opening of the North Sea Canal in 1876, and that of the Amsterdam–Zutphen railway led to great cost reductions. In 1877, the liquidation of the ASM led KNSM to expand its activity to Hamburg.

In 1879 the KNSM succeeded in ending its failed Transatlantic adventure. Stad Amsterdam was sold to the Compagnie Générale Transatlantique in Spring and was renamed. Somewhat later, the Stad Haarlem was sold to the same company. The price was less than half of that for which they had been built. The company took the loss by reducing the share capital by 50%. At the same time, the board accepted a drastic reduction in its rewards. Meanwhile, the KNSM was very successful in trading with Russia via Tallinn up to 1879.

=== Second failed attempt at Atlantic shipping ===
Shortly after the sale of the two 3,500 ton ocean liners, the transatlantic shipping market turned around. The Rotterdam NASM had lost half its capital, but made solid profits in 1879 and 1880. In 1880 it even chartered KNSM's Pollux and Castor for its trade to New York, even though these ships were too small in an economic sense. Some merchants, and also the Netherlands Trading Society then offered KNSM some guarantees against losses, if it would start a line from Amsterdam to New York. This happened when on 3 March 1881 KNSM sent Pollux to New York. Castor, Stella and Jason followed.

In 1882 KNSM chartered Surrey and Nemesis of 4,000 ton each. The year started successfully, but then a deadly disease killed 13 babies aboard Nemesis, which turned migrants away from KNSM. Meanwhile, NASM had started a competing line from Amsterdam, and so KNSM' New York line ended 1882 with a loss of 300,000 guilders. KNSM then agreed with the NASM, and ceased its New York operations.

== Reorientation and restructuring (1883–1900) ==
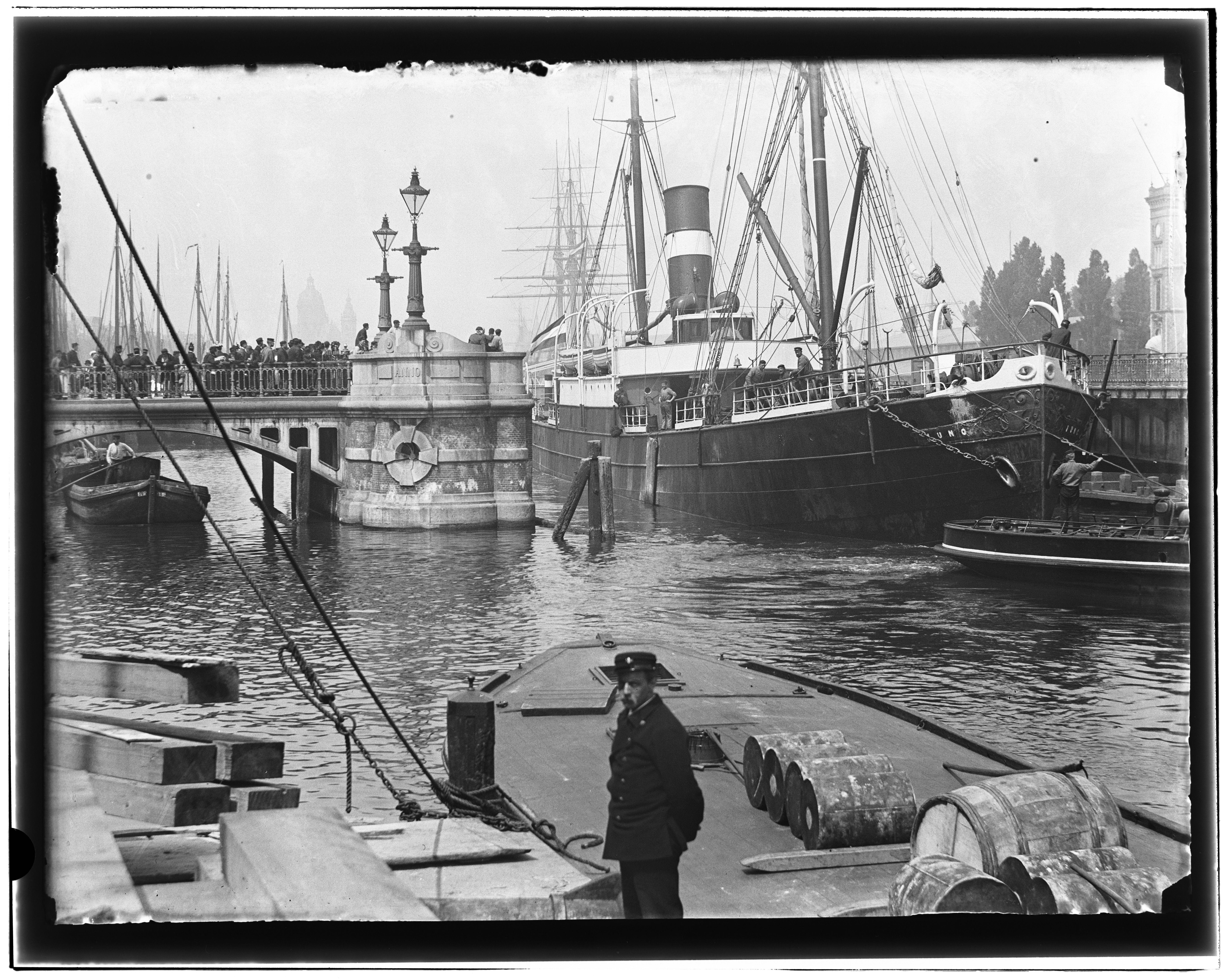
Juno at the Kattenburger bridge in 1895

After some relatively good years, the affairs of KNSM took a turn for the worse after the 1884 cholera outbreak in Marseille. The outbreak led to many KNSM ships spending considerable time lying idle in quarantine while cost continued. Over 1884 and 1885, there was no dividend and over 1886 only 2%. In 1886 steps were taken to restructure the 1869 5% bonds. With support of the banks, these were either repaid or replaced with 4% bonds, saving the company 45,000 guilders a year.

The harbor of Amsterdam had always relied on the transshipment of goods. In time, this had shifted from coastal traffic to inland navigation and rail transport. While inland navigation on the Rhine became more important in the nineteenth century, Amsterdam's part in this traffic had decreased from 25% in 1850 to about 5% in 1870. This decrease had to do with the increasing size of inland navigation vessels, which the canals leading to Amsterdam could not handle. The government then invested to improve the route from Amsterdam to the Rhine, leading to the opening of the Merwede Canal in 1891. The KNSM reacted by taking part in the Amsterdamsche Beurtvaart Maatschappij, which opened lines to Cologne (1893), Frankfurt (1894) and Strasbourg (1897).

In the late 1880s overall trading conditions began to improve. Over 1887 5% dividend was paid, which increased to 10% over 1888. In the 1890s the KNSM continued to be very profitable. However, apart from replacing old ships with new ones, there was little entrepreneurship in these years. Both directors and supervisors were paralyzed by their memories of the 1870s. However that might be, the steady improvement of the company's position led to a share price that was way above nominal value. In 1900 this led to a restructuring which sold 300,000 guilders of new nominal shares for 450,000 and reduced the 2,500,000 guilder 1886 loan to only 529,000 guilders.

== New expansion (1900–1918) ==
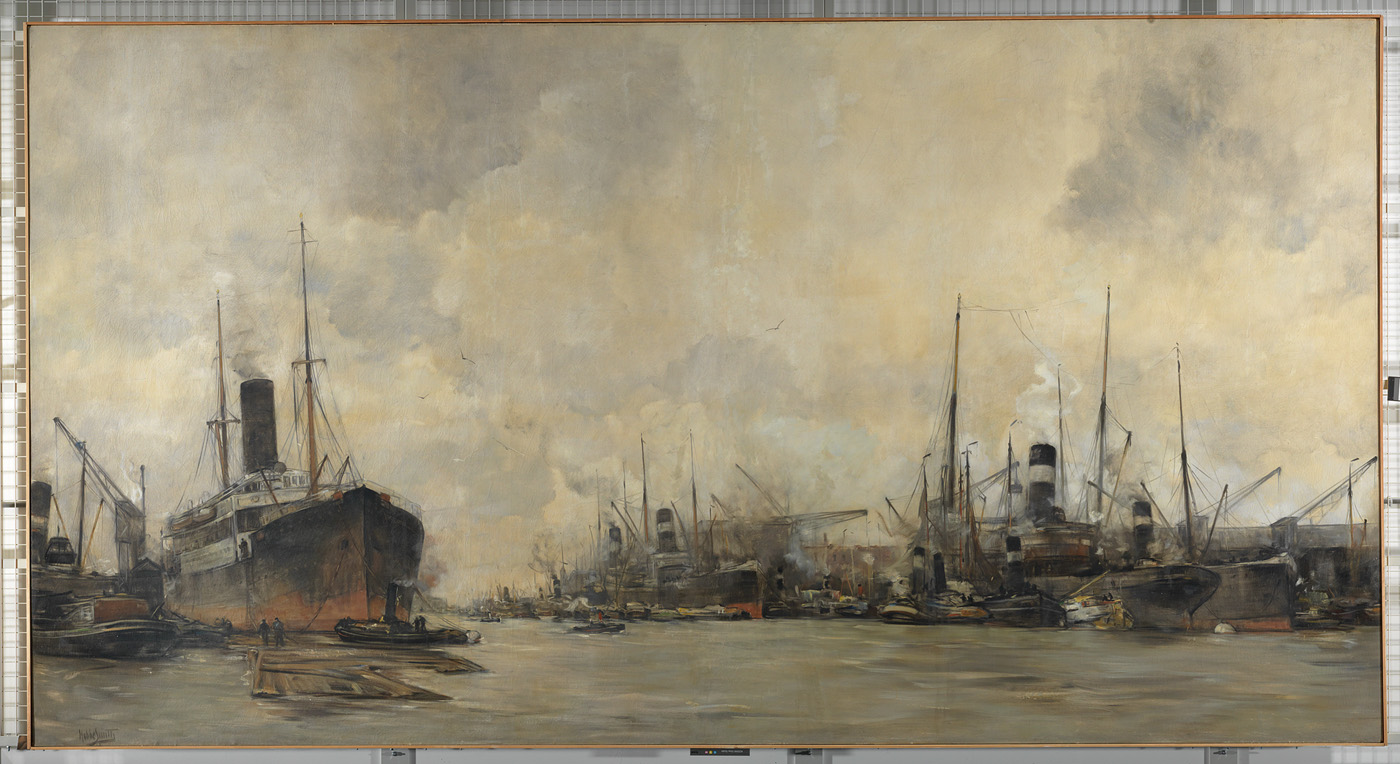
KNSM ships on the Levantkade, 1913

In 1900 the KNSM was a modest company. It paid a steady dividend, but had suffered from high debts for many years. Its buildings on the Nieuwe Vaart were outdated and the Oosterdok Lock led to many delays. Both the Oosterdok Lock and the Kattenburg Bridge seriously limited the size of some of the KNSM ships, and led to many delays. That same year the KNSM suddenly expanded again, probably due to an improved financial situation and a rejuvenated board. The first acts consisted of ordering two big ships when prices were low. More ships followed, as well as new facilities on the Levantkade, later part of the KNSM Island. The Levantkade (Levant quay), hired by KNSM, got electric cranes, and was taken into use in June 1903. It led to very big cost reductions, and by 1906, the company's debt had disappeared. In 1900 KNSM had 30 ships, of these 17 measured 1,000 tons or smaller. By 1914 KNSM had 50 ships, only two of these were smaller than 1,000 tons.

KNSM now expanded its activities in the Mediterranean. In December 1905 it joined an agreement between two lines sailing from Antwerp to Alexandria. It brought KNSM into conflict with the Bremen Atlas line. When other German lines began to support the Atlas line, KNSM joined the Nationale Stoomboot Maatschappij (National steam navigation company), a company founded to defend Dutch shipping companies against aggressive foreign shipping lines.

After the opening of the Merwede Canal, the services of the Amsterdamsche Beurtvaart Maatschappij, that was supported by KNSM, were still not satisfactory. KNSM then founded the Nieuwe Rijnvaart Maatschappij (NRM) in 1903. NRM started its operations with four 650 ton steam vessels. The NRM became an immediate success. It expanded its fleet to 26 ships in 1914. The freight that it transported grew from 47,931 ton in the first year to 331,982 ton in 1913.

The Koninklijke West-Indische Maildienst (KWIM) was a shipping company that sailed to Suriname and Curaçao. It was small and therefore vulnerable to competition. In June 1912 a plan for takeover by KNSM succeeded. This allowed KNSM to expand to the Caribbean, and gave KWIM the means to acquire bigger ships.

=== World War I ===
In World War I the Dutch overseas import and export were severely limited. However, because of the high demand for shipping for the Allied war effort, freights were high. Furthermore, the absence of competitors opened many possibilities. In 1914 and 1915 KNSM expanded to North- and South America and to Africa. The situation became less favorable when the government started to intervene in 1916. The reasons to do so were the sale of Dutch ships and the many that were sunk, endangering vital imports.

In 1917 the situation became a crisis due to the start of the unrestricted submarine warfare on 1 February. This severely limited shipping, and brought traffic on the Rhine to a standstill. On 21 March 1918 the alliance then seized 22 ships of the KNSM and KWIM. Many of these had been cleverly held up in allied ports on the pretext of checking cargo. It was a blatant infringement on neutrality, but the Netherlands could not do much.

The profits of KNSM during the war were high. Over 1914 it paid 6% divided, over 1915 15%, over 1916 20%, over 1917 10%. Over 1918 15% was paid, but this was due to the money that the allied powers paid for using the ships they had seized. The KNSM fleet measured 135,650 tons on 1 January 1914, and 199,000 tons on 31 December 1918, the latter including ships under construction. Over the same period, the surface of the KNSM warehouses expanded from 16,545 m^{3} to 63,564 m^{3}

== From 1918 to 1945 ==
=== The post war shipping crisis 1918–1928 ===
After World War I, many felt that shipping would rebound. It led to huge investments in ships. KNSM and its daughter KWIM had 21 steamships under construction in November 1919. Over 1919 KNSM indeed paid a dividend of 20%. However, it soon became clear that way too many ships were getting built post war. As a result, freights plummeted. Over 1920 dividend was lower, but still high at 10%. Dutch shipping companies suffered disproportionally, because of the collapse of the German economy due to the Treaty of Versailles. Over 1921, the operational profit was 3,569,815 guilders, as opposed to 12,166,162 over 1920. After deprecations, the net profit was negligible, and no dividend was paid. The profit over 1922 was also negligible, with no dividend being paid. However, this was an administrative reality. By using 7,600,000 guilders of reserves for depreciations, the real loss, which amounted to about this sum was concealed. Over 1923, profit was again negligible, and reserves decreased by 3,000,000 guilders. 1924 was about as bad. While transport on the KNSM lines strongly increased, freight prices did not. There was a pattern that as soon as prices increased, some laid up ships were commissioned again, and so freight prices and consequently profitability, remained very low. In 1925 KNSM transported about the same amount of goods as in 1924 and on paper it made a comparable profit. However, over 1925 it deprecated its assets for about 3,300,000 guilders and did not use reserves before determining the profit. In 1926 there was a big increase in transported freight and freight prices increased a bit. KNSM ordered some new ships, and bought almost 8 ships second hand.

=== Integration of the Koninklijke West-Indische Maildienst (KWIM) ===
On 1 February 1927 a process to liquidate the Koninklijke West-Indische Maildienst (KWIM) and to integrate its business into KNSM started. For KNSM, the year 1927 put an end to the post war shipping crisis, and a dividend of 3% was paid. In 1928 results seemed comparable to 1927, but now over 1,000,000 guilders went to reserves before a 5% dividend was paid.

=== Great Depression and recovery ===
The Great Depression started with the October 1929 Wall Street Crash. As shown above KNSM had suffered from an economic crisis for some time by then. Over the whole 1929, KNSM results were comparable to 1928, with again a 5% dividend. In 1930 KNSM lost money, with 15 ships being idle in July. At the end of the year, KNSM was obliged to decrease its reserves with about one million guilders. In 1931 revenue decreased by 7.5 million guilders, while cost decreased with only 3.5 million. It resulted in a loss of about 10 million guilders, which was covered by decreasing the general and pension reserves by 6.5 and 3.5 million. In 1932 revenue decreased by another 8 million guilders. The net result was comparable, but KNSM nevertheless started to modernize her fleet by ordering a motor ship. in 1933 losses were still 5.5 million guilders, and while interest on bonds was still paid, installments were no longer met. The government now started to support KNSM. In 1934 the volume of cargo and passenger traffic increased, but the devaluation of the British pound meant that KNSM did not profit that much. At the end of the year the operating result had improved to minus 200,000 guilders, but the loss was still in the millions.

The big losses, and the exhaustion of KNSM's reserves would lead to a technical bankruptcy of KNSM in 1936. In 1935 it had made an operational profit of about 1 million guilders, but this was due to government subsidies. The net loss was still in the millions, and so the government demanded a financial restructuring of the company if it wanted to get support in 1936. By that time, staff had been reduced from 5,500 to 4,100, and the number of ships had gone down from 89 to 72. In late May 1936 the bond holders then agreed to a cash payment of 400 guilders for each 1,000 guilder bond together with a 500 guilder share in the new N.V. Nationaal Bezit van Aandelen Kon. Ned. Stoombootmij, which would hold all shares. The old shareholders would lose their shares.

The recovery of KNSM was quite sudden. In September 1936, only a few months after the reorganization of KNSM, the Dutch government was forced to devaluate the guilder. This immediately improved profitability of KNSM, because many freight contracts were made in English pounds. KNSM therefore got more guilders for the same offer in GBP. In November the whole freight market then started to rise. The year ended with a 3 percent dividend. KNSM then emitted new shares for 5,556,500 guilders, so share capital was brought back to 10,000,000 guilders. KNSM kept its promise to the old shareholders and gave them an equal claim with regard to buying the new shares, making that both the old shareholders and bond holders were the main purchasers. Over 1937 results were good and a 7% dividend was paid. In 1938 results were also good, but KNSM still had to assign profits to reserves, because the book value of many ships was still higher than their replacement value. Over 1939 net profit was 6,132,728 a number very close to the share capital itself. Nevertheless, divided was still only 8%. because the renewal of the fleet would require huge sums.

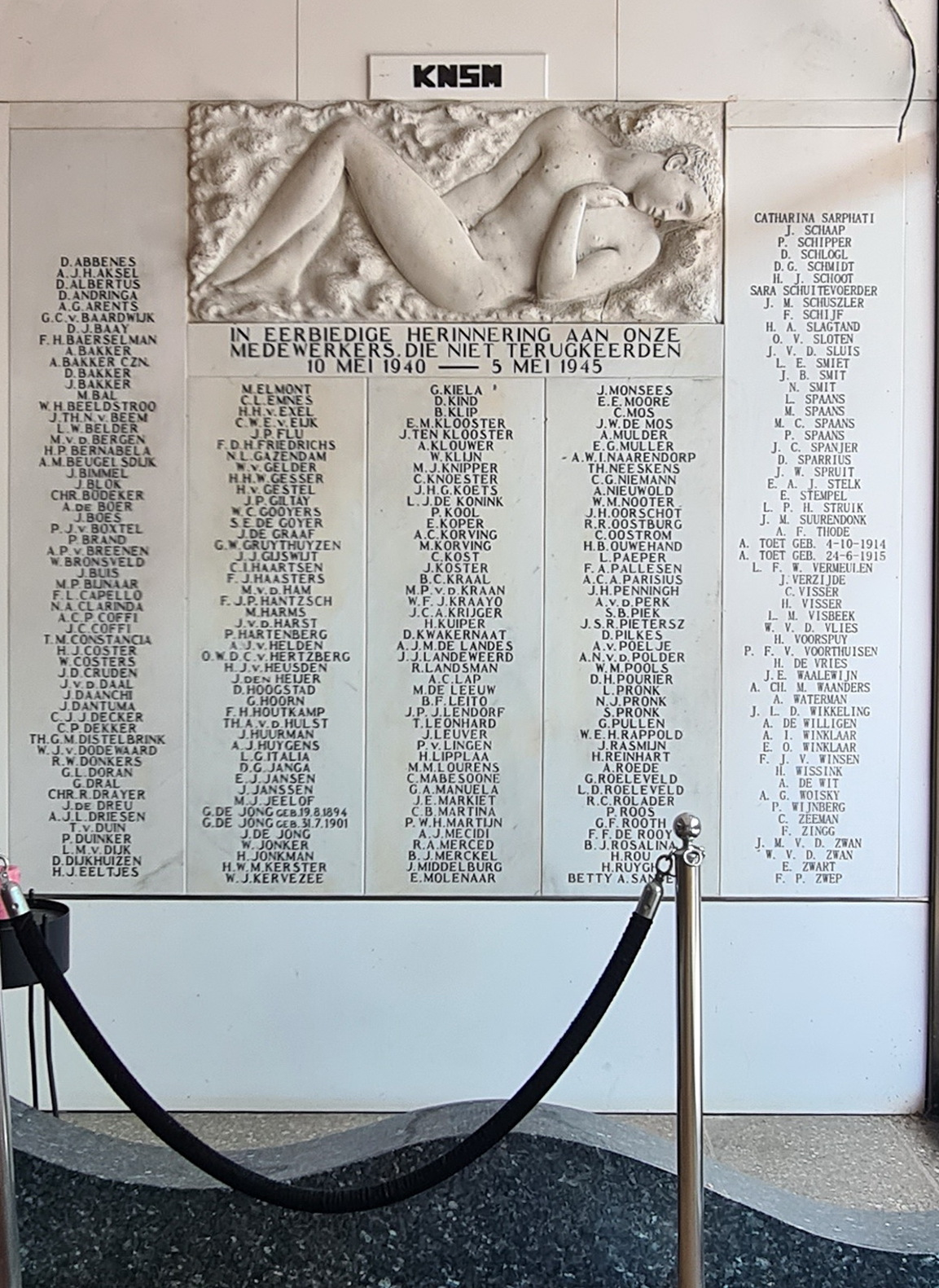
KNSM war monument in Amsterdam

=== World War II ===
Even while the Netherlands was neutral, KNSM lost its first ship to World War II. On 18 November 1939, two German magnetic mines sank the cargo liner Simon Bolivar off Harwich, killing about 85 of the 400 people aboard. When the Netherlands were invaded, the steamer Bodegraven was the last ship to leave IJmuiden on 14 May 1940. On board were 73 Jewish children from Germany. In World War II, 48 KNSM ships were lost, and 247 of the company's personnel were killed.

In 1947, the Dutch sculptor Pieter Starreveld created a stone plaque and relief sculpture listing all 247 personnel, and it was installed in the Scheepvaarthuis in Amsterdam. In 1992, this KNSM monument was relocated to the Oosterdok. In 2005, it was relocated again, to the Kompaszaal on KNSM Island.

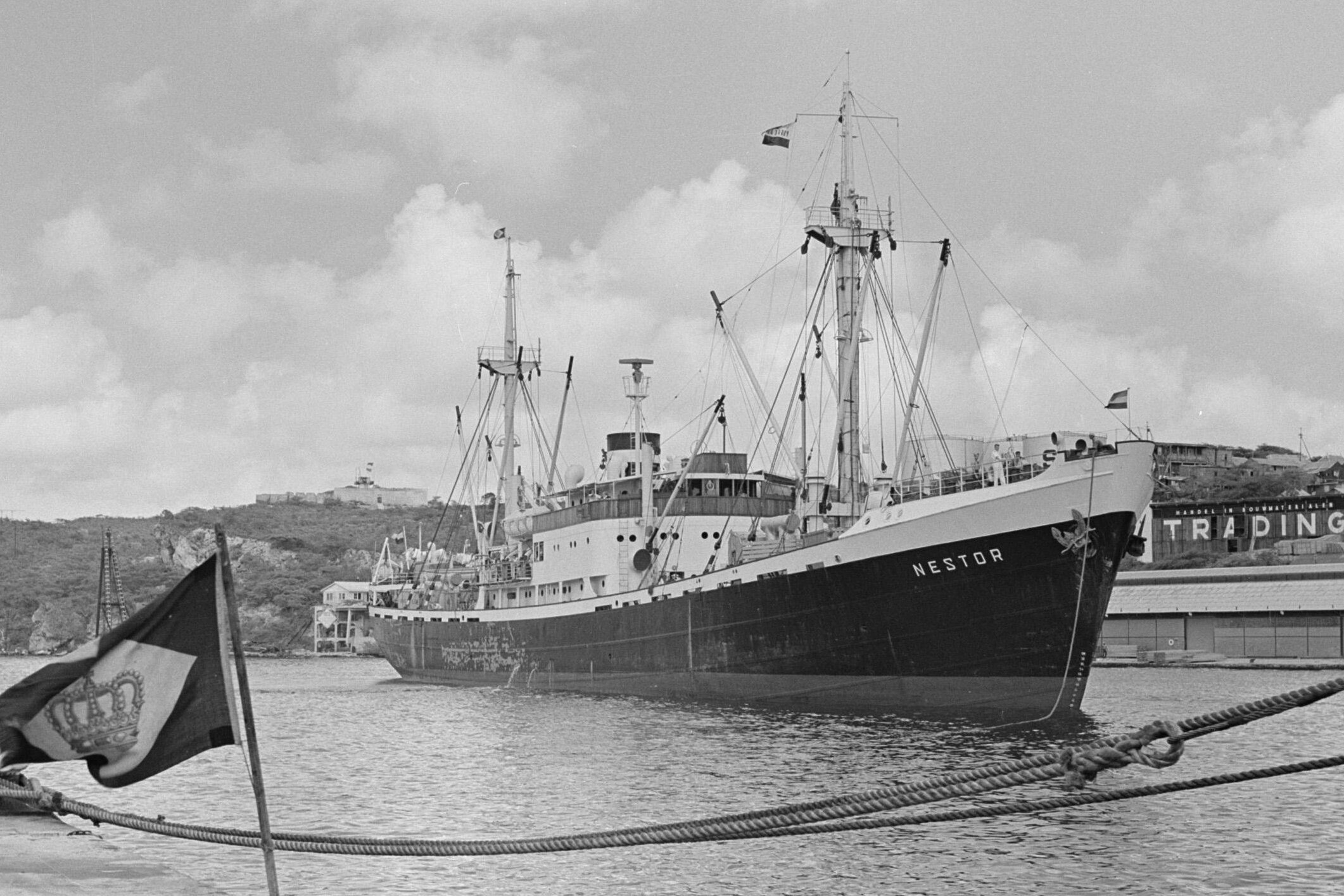
mv Nestor at Willemstad, 1955

== 1945–1981 ==
In 1972 the company changed its name to KNSM BV, part of the parent company KNSM Group NV. In 1981, they merged into Nedlloyd.

The company headquarters building on the Prins Hendrikkade in Amsterdam is still called the Scheepvaarthuis (Shipping House) and is now a hotel.
