= List of Face Off episodes =

Face Off is an American reality television game show on the Syfy cable network in which a group of prosthetic makeup artists compete against each other to create prostheses such as those found in science fiction and horror films.

Face Off premiered January 26, 2011 on Syfy. As of August 7, 2018, 160 episodes of Face Off have aired.

== Series overview ==
Season	Premiere	Finale	Winner	Runners-Up	Number of contestants	Number of episodes
1	January 26, 2011	March 16, 2011	Conor McCullagh	Gage Hubbard; Tate Steinsiek	12	8
2	January 11, 2012	March 14, 2012	Rayce Bird	Ian Cromer; Robert "RJ" Haddy	14	10
3	August 21, 2012	October 31, 2012	Nicole Chilelli	Laura Dandridge; Derek Garcia	12	12
4	January 15, 2013	March 26, 2013	Anthony Kosar	Kristian "Kris" Kobzina; Wayne Anderson	14	11
5	August 13, 2013	November 5, 2013	Laura Dandridge	Tate Steinsiek; Roy Wooley	16	13
6	January 14, 2014	April 22, 2014	Rashaad Santiago	George Schminky; Tyler Green	15	15
7	July 22, 2014	October 28, 2014	Dina Cimarusti	Cig Neutron; Drew Talbot	16	14
8	January 13, 2015	April 14, 2015	Darla Edin	Emily Serpico; Logan Long	15	14
9	July 28, 2015	October 27, 2015	Nora Hewitt	Ben Ploughman; Evan Hedges	16	14
10	January 13, 2016	April 13, 2016	Rob Seal	Micah Ebbe; Walter Welsh	14	14
11	January 24, 2017	April 25, 2017	Cig Neutron	Emily Serpico; George Troester III	16	14
12	June 13, 2017	August 22, 2017	Andrew Freeman	KC Mussman; Kierstin Lapatka	12	10
13	June 5, 2018	August 7, 2018	Matt Valentine	Jordan Patton; Walter Welsh	12	10

== Episode list ==
=== Season 1 (2011) ===
No. overall	No. in season	Title	Original release date	Viewers (millions)	Rating (18-49)
1	1	"Welcome to the Jungle"	January 26, 2011	1.440	0.7/2
2	2	"Naked Ambition"	February 2, 2011	1.041	0.5/1
3	3	"Out of This World"	February 9, 2011	1.286	0.6/2
4	4	"Bad to the Bone"	February 16, 2011	1.165	0.6/2
5	5	"Switched and Hitched"	February 23, 2011	1.320	0.6/2
6	6	"The Dancing Dead"	March 2, 2011	1.490	0.7/2
7	7	"Family Plot"	March 9, 2011	1.325	0.6/2
8	8	"Twisted Tales"	March 16, 2011	1.494	0.7/2

=== Season 2 (2012) ===
No. overall	No. in season	Title	Original release date	Viewers (millions)	Rating (18-49)
9	1	"Return to Oz"	January 11, 2012	1.972	0.9
10	2	"Water World"	January 18, 2012	1.808	0.8
11	3	"Rock Your Body"	January 25, 2012	1.690	0.8
12	4	"Night Terrors"	February 1, 2012	2.144	0.9
13	5	"Dangerous Beauty"	February 8, 2012	2.198	1.0
14	6	"Triple Threat"	February 15, 2012	2.036	0.9
15	7	"Alien Interpreters"	February 22, 2012	1.729	0.8
16	8	"Burtonesque"	February 29, 2012	1.781	0.9
17	9	"Dinoplasty"	March 7, 2012	2.266	1.0
18	10	"The Ultimate Spotlight Challenge"	March 14, 2012	2.465	1.1

=== Season 3 (2012) ===
No. overall	No. in season	Title	Original release date	U.S. viewers (millions)	18-49 Rating
19	1	"A Force to Be Reckoned With"	August 21, 2012	1.837	0.8
20	2	"Pirate Treasure"	August 28, 2012	1.583	0.7
21	3	"Year of the Dragon"	September 4, 2012	1.759	0.8
22	4	"Alice in Zombieland"	September 11, 2012	1.410	0.7
23	5	"Supermobile"	September 18, 2012	1.799	0.9
24	6	"Dishonorable Proportions"	September 25, 2012	1.491	0.7
25	7	"Monster Twist"	October 2, 2012	1.668	0.8
26	8	"Who's the New Who?"	October 9, 2012	1.799	0.8
27	9	"Junkyard Cyborg"	October 16, 2012	1.792	0.9
28	10	"Scene of the Crime"	October 23, 2012	1.715	0.8
29	11	"Immortal Enemies"	October 30, 2012	2.096	1.2
30	12	"Live Finale"	October 31, 2012	1.613	0.8

=== Season 4 (2013) ===
No. overall	No. in season	Title	Original release date	U.S. viewers (millions)	18-49 Rating
31	1	"Make it Reign"	January 15, 2013	1.8	1.0
32	2	"Heroic Proportions"	January 22, 2013	1.756	0.7
33	3	"When Hell Freezes Over"	January 29, 2013	1.99	0.9
34	4	"Eye Candy"	February 5, 2013	1.8	0.7
35	5	"Two Heads Are Better Than One"	February 12, 2013	1.74	0.8
36	6	"Bugging Out"	February 19, 2013	1.8	0.8
37	7	"Howl at the Moon"	February 26, 2013	1.82	0.9
38	8	"It's Better in the Dark"	March 5, 2013	1.6	0.7
39	9	"Mummy Mayhem"	March 12, 2013	1.6	0.7
40	10	"Alien Apocalypse"	March 19, 2013	1.6	0.8
41	11	"Living the Dream"	March 26, 2013	1.77	0.8

=== Season 5 (2013) ===
No. overall	No. in season	Title	Original release date	U.S. viewers (millions)	18-49 Rating
42	1	"Going for Gold"	August 13, 2013	1.27	0.6
43	2	"Future Frankenstein"	August 20, 2013	1.37	0.7
44	3	"Gettin' Goosed"	August 27, 2013	1.59	0.8
45	4	"Subterranean Terror"	September 3, 2013	1.55	0.9
46	5	"Mother Earth Goddess"	September 10, 2013	1.48	0.7
47	6	"Trick or Treat"	September 17, 2013	1.82	0.9
48	7	"Living Art"	September 24, 2013	1.43	0.7
49	8	"Cosmic Circus"	October 1, 2013	1.38	0.6
50	9	"Mortal Sins"	October 8, 2013	1.35	0.6
51	10	"Laughing Dead"	October 15, 2013	1.77	0.8
52	11	"Dark Magic"	October 22, 2013	1.68	0.7
53	12	"Flights of Fantasy"	October 29, 2013	1.85	0.9
54	13	"Swan Song"	November 5, 2013	1.80	0.7

=== Season 6 (2014) ===
No. overall	No. in season	Title	Original release date	U.S. viewers (millions)	18-49 Rating
55	1	"Sexy Beasts"	January 14, 2014	1.39	0.6
56	2	"Cosmic Conspiracy"	January 21, 2014	1.52	0.7
57	3	"Dragon's Breath"	January 28, 2014	1.42	0.7
58	4	"Guitar Gods"	February 4, 2014	1.39	0.7
59	5	"In the Shadows"	February 11, 2014	1.35	0.6
60	6	"Cryptic Creatures"	February 18, 2014	1.86	0.9
61	7	"Open Sesame"	February 25, 2014	1.12	0.5
62	8	"Ego Trip Abroad"	March 4, 2014	1.21	0.6
63	9	"Mad Science"	March 11, 2014	1.25	0.5
64	10	"What a Dahl"	March 18, 2014	1.27	0.6
65	11	"Freaks of Nature"	March 25, 2014	1.23	0.5
66	12	"Industrial Revolution"	April 1, 2014	1.11	0.6
67	13	"Bloodsuckers"	April 8, 2014	1.33	0.6
68	14	"Cry Wolf"	April 15, 2014	1.29	0.6
69	15	"Heavenly Bodies"	April 22, 2014	1.36	0.7

=== Season 7 (2014) ===
No. overall	No. in season	Title	Original release date	U.S. viewers (millions)	18-49 Rating
70	1	"Life and Death"	July 22, 2014	1.20	0.5
71	2	"American Gangster"	July 29, 2014	1.05	0.4
72	3	"Ancient Aliens"	August 5, 2014	1.16	0.4
73	4	"Twisted Trees"	August 12, 2014	1.30	0.5
74	5	"Animal Attraction"	August 19, 2014	1.22	0.5
75	6	"Wizard of Wonderland"	August 26, 2014	1.24	0.5
76	Special	"Judge Match"	September 2, 2014	1.22	0.5
77	7	"Killer Instinct"	September 9, 2014	1.25	0.5
78	8	"Serpent Soldiers"	September 16, 2014	1.32	0.5
79	9	"Scared Silly"	September 23, 2014	1.30	0.6
80	10	"Teacher's Pets"	September 30, 2014	1.30	0.6
81	11	"Off with Their Heads"	October 7, 2014	1.26	0.6
82	12	"Beautiful Disaster"	October 14, 2014	1.20	0.5
83	13	"Creature Carnage"	October 21, 2014	1.26	0.5
84	14	"One Knight Only"	October 28, 2014	1.39	0.6

=== Season 8 (2015) ===
No. overall	No. in season	Title	Original release date	U.S. viewers (millions)	18-49 Rating
85	1	"Return of the Champions"	January 13, 2015	1.19	0.5
86	2	"Monkey Business"	January 20, 2015	1.04	0.4
87	3	"Let The Games Begin"	January 27, 2015	1.12	0.4
88	4	"Royal Flush"	February 3, 2015	0.88	0.3
89	5	"Sounding Off"	February 10, 2015	0.99	0.4
90	6	"Troll Bridge"	February 17, 2015	1.08	0.4
91	7	"Queen Bees"	February 24, 2015	1.01	0.4
92	8	"Dressed To Kill"	March 3, 2015	1.15	0.5
93	9	"Miss Intergalactic"	March 10, 2015	1.19	0.4
94	10	"Super Selfies"	March 17, 2015	1.01	0.4
95	11	"Imaginary Friends"	March 24, 2015	1.20	0.4
96	12	"Deadly Dolls"	March 31, 2015	1.26	0.4
97	13	"Full Steam Ahead"	April 7, 2015	1.054	0.34
98	14	"The Dream Team"	April 14, 2015	1.197	0.42

=== Season 9 (2015) ===
No. overall	No. in season	Title	Original release date	U.S. viewers (millions)	18-49 Rating
99	1	"Intergalactic Zoo"	July 28, 2015	1.18	0.4
100	2	"Siren Song"	August 4, 2015	0.86	0.3
101	3	"Surprise of the Century"	August 11, 2015	0.94	0.4
102	4	"Frightful Fiction"	August 18, 2015	0.88	0.4
103	5	"The Gatekeepers"	August 25, 2015	0.95	0.4
104	6	"Extraterrestrial Enterprise"	September 1, 2015	0.88	0.3
105	7	"All That Glitters"	September 8, 2015	0.94	0.4
106	8	"The Gauntlet"	September 15, 2015	0.94	0.4
107	9	"Judgment Day"	September 22, 2015	0.94	0.4
108	10	"Freak Show"	September 29, 2015	0.92	0.4
109	11	"Beyond the Expanse"	October 6, 2015	0.88	0.2
110	12	"Death Becomes Them"	October 13, 2015	0.98	0.4
111	13	"Movie Magic, Part 1"	October 20, 2015	0.85	0.3
112	14	"Movie Magic, Part 2"	October 27, 2015	1.05	0.4

=== Season 10 (2016) ===
No. overall	No. in season	Title	Original release date	U.S. viewers (millions)	18-49 Rating
113	1	"Wanted Dead or Alive"	January 13, 2016	0.98	0.3
114	2	"Child's Play"	January 20, 2016	0.97	0.4
115	3	"Lost Languages"	January 27, 2016	1.08	0.4
116	4	"Covert Characters"	February 3, 2016	0.98	0.4
117	5	"Foreign Bodies"	February 10, 2016	0.87	0.3
118	6	"Death's Doorstep"	February 17, 2016	0.86	0.3
119	7	"The Gauntlet II"	February 24, 2016	0.94	0.4
120	8	"Smoke and Mirrors"	March 2, 2016	0.86	0.3
121	9	"Bottled Up"	March 9, 2016	0.95	0.3
122	10	"Keep One Eye Open"	March 16, 2016	0.91	0.3
123	11	"The Art of Warcraft"	March 23, 2016	0.89	0.3
124	12	"Skull Island: Reign of Kong"	March 30, 2016	0.96	0.3
125	13	"Sinister Showdown: Part 1"	April 6, 2016	0.82	0.3
126	14	"Sinister Showdown: Part 2"	April 13, 2016	1.02	0.4

=== Season 11 (2017) ===
No. overall	No. in season	Title	Original release date	U.S. viewers (millions)	18-49 Rating
127	1	"Abstract Aliens"	January 24, 2017	0.73	0.3
128	2	"The Devil is in the Details"	January 31, 2017	0.67	0.3
129	3	"Monster High"	February 7, 2017	0.77	0.3
130	4	"Snow Queens"	February 14, 2017	0.74	0.3
131	5	"Troubling Transformations"	February 21, 2017	0.73	0.3
132	6	"Wasteland Warriors"	February 28, 2017	0.81	0.3
133	7	"Puppet Masters"	March 7, 2017	0.70	0.3
134	8	"Odd Couples"	March 14, 2017	0.81	0.3
135	9	"Frightening Families"	March 21, 2017	0.96	0.3
136	10	"Cursed Covens"	March 28, 2017	0.92	0.4
137	11	"Intergalactic Congress"	April 4, 2017	0.81	0.3
138	12	"Tiki Twist"	April 11, 2017	0.86	0.3
139	13	"Gargoyle Guardians"	April 18, 2017	0.80	0.3
140	14	"Battle of the Beasts"	April 25, 2017	0.91	0.3

=== Season 12 (2017) ===
No. overall	No. in season	Title	Original release date	Viewers (millions)	Rating (18-49)
141	1	"Pack Leaders"	June 13, 2017	0.72	0.2
142	2	"Hive Mind"	June 20, 2017	0.52	0.2
143	3	"Dream House"	June 27, 2017	0.63	0.2
144	4	"Dante's Demons"	July 11, 2017	0.58	0.2
145	5	"String Theory"	July 18, 2017	0.64	0.2
146	6	"Possessed Possessions"	July 25, 2017	0.66	0.2
147	7	"Feral Fungi"	August 1, 2017	0.62	0.2
148	8	"Amusing Aliens"	August 8, 2017	0.63	0.2
149	9	"Journey Into Fear, Part 1"	August 15, 2017	0.70	0.2
150	10	"Journey Into Fear, Part 2"	August 22, 2017	0.54	0.2

=== Season 13 (2018) ===
No. overall	No. in season	Title	Original release date	U.S. viewers (millions)	18-49 Rating
151	1	"Face Your Fears"	June 5, 2018	N/A	TBA
152	2	"Moonlight Monsters"	June 12, 2018	N/A	TBA
153	3	"Aztec Aliens"	June 19, 2018	N/A	TBA
154	4	"Haunted Hotel"	June 26, 2018	N/A	TBA
155	5	"Death Dealers"	July 3, 2018	N/A	TBA
156	6	"Divine Dryads"	July 10, 2018	N/A	TBA
157	7	"Maritime Monsters"	July 17, 2018	N/A	TBA
158	8	"Immortals Interrupted"	July 24, 2018	N/A	TBA
159	9	"Through the Looking Glass, Part 1"	July 31, 2018	N/A	TBA
160	10	"Through the Looking Glass, Part 2"	August 7, 2018	N/A	TBA
