= Face Off season 5 =

Face Off
- Season 5
- No. of episodes: 13

Release
- Original network: Syfy
- Original release: August 13 – November 5, 2013

Season chronology
- ← Previous; Season 4 Next → Season 6

The fifth season of the Syfy reality television series Face Off premiered on August 13, 2013. The season features 16 prosthetic makeup artists competing against each other to create makeup effects. This is the first season to feature the return of eight prior contestants competing against eight new contestants. The grand prize for the fifth season is a VIP trip from Kryolan to one of their 85 locations, a 2013 Fiat 500, and $100,000. This is the second season where a contestant voluntarily left the competition, with the first being Season 3. Laura Dandridge of Orlando, Florida, was the winner of the season.

== Judges ==
- Ve Neill
- Glenn Hetrick
- Neville Page
- McKenzie Westmore (Host)
- Michael Westmore (mentor)

== Contestants ==
Name	Experience team	Age	Hometown	Place finished	Original season	Original finish
Steve Tolin	Newcomer	33	Pittsburgh, Pennsylvania	16th		
Sam Allen	Newcomer	27	Bayville, New Jersey	15th		
Rick Prince	Newcomer	38	Nashville, Tennessee	14th		
Eric Zapata	Veteran	23	Victoria, Texas	13th	Season 4	6th
Adolfo Barreto Rivera	Newcomer	32	Las Vegas, Nevada	12th		
Robert "RJ" Haddy	Veteran	38	Charleston, West Virginia	11th	Season 2	Runner Up
Lyma Millot	Newcomer	33	El Paso, Texas	10th		
Scott Ramp	Newcomer	52	Pasadena, California	9th		
Alana Rose Schiro	Veteran	21	North Hollywood, Los Angeles, California	8th	Season 3	6th
Frank Ippolito	Veteran	35	Toluca Lake, California	7th	Season 1	10th
Eddie Holecko	Newcomer	20	Berea, Ohio	6th		
Alaina 'Laney' Parkhurst	Newcomer	24	West Hollywood, Los Angeles, California	5th (withdrew)		
Miranda Jory	Veteran	23	Los Angeles, California	4th	Season 2	12th
Tate Steinsiek	Veteran	35	Tulsa, Oklahoma	Runner-up	Season 1	Runner Up
Roy Wooley	Veteran	47	Tucker, Georgia	Runner-up	Season 3	4th
Laura Dandridge	Veteran	28	Orlando, Florida	Winner	Season 3	Runner Up

== Contestant progress ==
Contestant	Episode												
Contestant	1	2	3	4	5	6	7	8	9	10	11	12	13
Laura	HIGH	HIGH	LOW	HIGH	WIN	IN	WIN	IN	IN	HIGH‡	HIGH	IN	WINNER
Roy	IN	IN	IN‡	LOW	HIGH	HIGH‡	IN‡	IN	LOW	WIN	LOW	IN	RUNNER-UP
Tate	IN‡	IN	HIGH	IN	IN	WIN	LOW	IN	WIN	IN	WIN	WIN	RUNNER-UP
Miranda	WIN	IN	WIN	WIN	IN	IN	HIGH	WIN	HIGH	IN	LOW	OUT	
Laney	HIGH	HIGH	HIGH	IN	IN	HIGH	HIGH	LOW	IN	LOW	QUIT		
Eddie	LOW	IN	IN	IN	LOW	IN	LOW	HIGH	IN	OUT			
Frank	LOW	IN	LOW	HIGH	IN	IN	IN	IN	OUT				
Alana	HIGH	WIN	HIGH	IN	IN	LOW	IN	OUT					
Scott	IN	IN	IN	LOW	LOW	LOW	OUT						
Lyma	IN	LOW	HIGH	IN	HIGH	OUT							
RJ	LOW	IN	IN	IN	OUT								
Adolfo	LOW	IN	HIGH	OUT									
Eric	LOW	LOW	OUT										
Rick	HIGH	IN	OUT										
Sam	IN	OUT											
Tolin	OUT												

The contestant was a Veteran.
The contestant was a Newcomer.
The contestant won Face Off.
The contestant was a runner-up.
The contestant won a Spotlight Challenge.
The contestant was part of a team that won the Spotlight Challenge.
The contestant was in the top in the Spotlight Challenge.
The contestant was in the bottom in the Spotlight Challenge.
The contestant was in the bottom in the Spotlight Challenge but was exempt from being eliminated.
The contestant was in the bottom in the Spotlight Challenge but was not eliminated due to a contestant dropping out of the competition.
The contestant was a teammate of the eliminated contestant in the Spotlight Challenge.
The contestant dropped out of the competition.
The contestant was eliminated.
‡ The contestant won the Foundation Challenge.

== Episodes ==
=== Special: The Vets Strike Back ===
A review of the eight veteran contestants' performances in their respective seasons by McKenzie and the judges along with a preview of the new season.

No. overall	No. in season	Title	Original release date	U.S. viewers (millions)	18-49 Rating
42	1	"Going for Gold"	August 13, 2013	1.27	0.6
Foundation Challenge: Creating an original character inspired by one of the costumed partygoers where the competitors met.; Guests: Yaya Han, Riki "Riddle" Lecotey, Jessica Merizan, Holly Conrad and Jesse Lagers of SyFy's Heroes of Cosplay. Guest Judge: Catherine Hardwicke Top Foundations: Tate, Roy and Laura Reward: Immunity Winner: Tate: Spotlight Challenge: The contestants worked as two teams of eight, veterans against newcomers, to create five original hyper stylized fantasy characters that would all fit in the same world.; Winning Team: Veterans Top Looks: Miranda & Alana - Pixie (Veterans) Laura - Witch (Veterans) Laney & Rick - Faun (Newcomers) Safe: Lyma - Pixie (Newcomers) Roy - Faun (Veterans) Sam & Scott - Witch (Newcomers) Tate - Troll (Veterans) Bottom Looks: Eric, Frank & RJ - Ogre (Veterans) Eddie & Tolin - Ogre (Newcomers) Adolfo - Troll (Newcomers) Winner: Miranda Eliminated: Tolin
43	2	"Future Frankenstein"	August 20, 2013	1.37	0.7
Spotlight Challenge: The contestants worked in teams of three to create futuristic versions of Frankenstein's monster and his bride.; Guest Judge: Kevin Grevioux Reward: The winner's work will be featured at Universal Studios' Halloween Horror Nights 23. Top Look: Alana, Laney & Laura - Living Battery and Charger Safe: Adolfo, Roy & Scott - Monster Resurrecting His Bride Eddie & Miranda - Brainwashed Cyborgs Frank & Rick - Genetically Connected RJ & Tate - Post-Apocalyptic Adam and Eve Bottom Looks: Eric - Genetically Connected Lyma - Post-Apocalyptic Adam and Eve Sam - Brainwashed Cyborgs Winner: Alana Eliminated: Sam
44	3	"Gettin' Goosed"	August 27, 2013	1.59	0.8
Foundation Challenge: The artists must turn a male model into a female demon inspired by Insidious Chapter 2.; Guest Judge: Glenn Hetrick Top Foundations: Rick and Roy Reward: Director James Wan announced via satellite that the winner will receive a copy of Insidious and attend the red carpet premiere of Insidious Chapter 2 with a friend. Winner: Roy: Spotlight Challenge: In a double elimination, contestants must work in teams of two (of their choice) to create a modern Mother Goose character with a twist.; Top Looks: Adolfo & Lyma - Humpty Dumpty Alana & Laney - This Little Piggy Miranda & Tate - Peter Peter Pumpkin Eater Safe: Eddie & Scott - The Man in the Moon RJ & Roy - The Cat and the Fiddle Bottom Looks: Frank & Laura - Little Miss Muffet Eric & Rick - The Crooked Sixpence Winner: Miranda Eliminated: Rick & Eric
45	4	"Subterranean Terror"	September 3, 2013	1.55	0.9
Spotlight Challenge: The artists' first individual challenge is to use the clues they find in an abandoned power plant's tunnel system to create a subterranean creature.; Guest Judge: Jordu Schell Top Looks: Frank - Chains & Electrical Panel Laura - Scratches & Chains Miranda - Broken Door & Hair Safe: Alana - Kelp & Sea Life Eddie - Toxic Waste & Bones Laney - Broken Door & Hair Lyma - Toxic Waste & Bones RJ - Scratches & Chains Tate - Kelp & Sea Life Bottom Looks: Adolfo - Chains & Electrical Panel Roy - Tentacles & Ink Scott - Tentacles & Ink Winner: Miranda Eliminated: Adolfo
46	5	"Mother Earth Goddess"	September 10, 2013	1.48	0.7
Spotlight Challenge: The artists' challenge is to create a mother nature deity that incorporates their mothers in the design.; Top Looks: Laura Lyma Roy Safe: Alana Frank Laney Miranda Tate Bottom Looks: Eddie RJ Scott Winner: Laura Eliminated: RJ SPECIAL NOTE: During the end credits there is a note that states 'During the taping of this episode, it became apparent that a rules violation occurred. The producers took the action they deemed appropriate to address and remedy the situation.'
47	6	"Trick or Treat"	September 17, 2013	1.82	0.9
Foundation Challenge: The artists must create an original makeup inspired by a pair of false teeth.; Guest Judge: Valli O'Reilly Top Foundations: Tate, Roy, and Miranda Reward: Immunity Winner: Roy: Spotlight Challenge: The artists' challenge is to create a monster based on a Halloween costume and add a gimmick to its design.; Top Looks: Laney - Clown Roy - Devil Tate - Skeleton Safe: Eddie - Scarecrow Frank - Scarecrow Laura - Vampire Miranda - Skeleton Bottom Looks: Alana - Devil Lyma - Vampire Scott - Clown Winner: Tate Eliminated: Lyma
48	7	"Living Art"	September 24, 2013	1.43	0.7
Foundation Challenge: The artists must create an original makeup inspired by Elvira.; Guest Judge: Elvira Top Foundations: Tate and Roy Reward: Immunity and a fully stocked makeup kit from Kryolan. Winner: Roy: Spotlight Challenge: The artists' challenge is to create a character who would reflect an art movement.; Top Looks: Laney - Pop Art Laura - Cubism Miranda - Cubism Safe: Alana - Constructivism Frank - Constructivism Roy - Expressionism Bottom Looks: Eddie - Expressionism Scott - Surrealism Tate - Surrealism Winner: Laura Eliminated: Scott
49	8	"Cosmic Circus"	October 1, 2013	1.38	0.6
Spotlight Challenge: The artists' challenge is to create dark and sexy alien-circus performers, inspired by Cirque Berzerk. The models (actual members of the Cirque Berzerk troupe) will perform as members of an intergalactic circus troupe. The artists are divided into four teams of two, of their choice.; Top Looks: Eddie & Miranda - Seductive Contortionist Safe: Frank & Tate - Punk-Rock Dumpster Dweller Laura & Roy - Parasite/Host Animal Tamer Bottom Looks: Alana & Laney - Reptilian Ringmaster Winner: Miranda Eliminated: Alana
50	9	"Mortal Sins"	October 8, 2013	1.35	0.6
Spotlight Challenge: The artists' challenge is to create a forbidding character that embodies one of the Seven Deadly Sins. The competitors must also incorporate the color representing their chosen sin into their designs.; Guest Judge: Bryan Fuller Top Looks: Miranda - Lust (Blue) Tate - Sloth (Light Blue) Safe: Eddie - Envy (Green) Laney - Greed (Yellow) Laura - Wrath (Red) Bottom Looks: Frank - Gluttony (Orange) Roy - Pride (Violet) Winner: Tate Eliminated: Frank
51	10	"Laughing Dead"	October 15, 2013	1.77	0.8
Foundation Challenge: The artists must create the head under the hood for the iconic Grim Reaper.; Guest Judge: Patrick Tatopoulos Top Foundations: Laura and Tate Reward: Immunity Winner: Laura: Spotlight Challenge: The artists must create horror-comedy ghosts, in the tradition of films like Beetlejuice.; Top Looks: Laura - Mad Scientist Roy - Vaudeville Performers Safe: Miranda - Marie Antoinette Tate - Acting Cowboy Bottom Looks: Eddie - Baseball Player Laney - Punk Rock Girl Winner: Roy Eliminated: Eddie
52	11	"Dark Magic"	October 22, 2013	1.68	0.7
Spotlight Challenge: The artists must create an original dark elf character reflecting ancient Norse runes. The artists each pick a rune, but are only told its meaning after choosing.; Top Looks: Laura - Perthro (ᛈ) (Occult Abilities) Tate - Berkano (ᛒ) (Regeneration) Bottom Looks: Miranda - Thurisaz (ᚦ) (Chaos) Roy - Laguz (ᛚ) (Psychic Powers) Winner: Tate Dropped Out: Laney - Eihwaz (ᛇ) (Immortality) Eliminated: No One
53	12	"Flights of Fantasy"	October 29, 2013	1.85	0.9
Spotlight Challenge: The artists must create a human-bird hybrid using a real bird as their inspiration.; Winner: Tate - Egyptian vulture Safe: Laura - Umbrella cockatoo Roy - Blue-throated macaw Eliminated: Miranda - Silvery-cheeked hornbill
54	13	"Swan Song"	November 5, 2013	1.80	0.7
Spotlight Challenge: The final three must create two characters, a Swan and a Sorcerer, based on different time periods for a performance of Swan Lake.; Laura - assisted by Eddie & Miranda - used an Italian Renaissance theme Roy - assisted by Frank & Scott - used a Ming Dynasty theme Tate - assisted by Alana & Lyma - used an Industrial Revolution theme Winner: Laura
