= Castle Freak (2020 film) =

2020 film by Tate Steinsiek

- Official release poster
- Directed by: Tate Steinsiek
- Written by: Kathy Charles
- Based on: Castle Freak "The Outsider" by H. P. Lovecraft
- Produced by: Kathy Charles; Barbara Crampton; Matt Manjourides; Justin A. Martell
- Starring: Emily Sweet; Omar Shariff Brunson Jr. Clair Catherine; Chris Galust; Jake Horowitz; Klodian Hoxha; Genti Kame; Klodjana Keco; Kika Magalhães
- Cinematography: Spiro Nino
- Music by: Fabio Frizzi
- Production company: Fangoria
- Distributed by: RLJE Films
- Release date: December 4, 2020
- Running time: 106 minutes
- Country: United States
- Language: English

Castle Freak is a 2020 American horror film directed by Tate Steinsiek. It is a remake of the 1995 film by Stuart Gordon, which is a loose adaptation of the stories "The Outsider" and "The Dunwich Horror" by H.P. Lovecraft.

== Plot ==
Rebecca "Becca" Riley was blinded in an accident caused by her boyfriend John driving under the influence. This puts a strain on their relationship.

Marku, an estate agent in Albania, informs Becca that her biological mother Lavinia Whateley is dead, leaving a castle as her inheritance. Both Becca and John are excited by the news. John wants to quickly sell the castle and depart, while Becca wants to learn more about Lavinia.

Unbeknownst to Becca, the castle contains a monstrous creature that her mother had been keeping chained and that had recently been freed by an unknown person. Once at the castle, she starts hearing strange sounds and has visions, some of which are caused by the creature. John refuses to believe her, making their relationship tenser.

John has invited four people to the castle. Among them is Shelly, a woman he has been flirting with. Also in the group is The Professor, who has been studying the occult while attending Miskatonic University and the only one to believe Becca is hearing things. Investigating the castle, they find a Necronomicon and discover a series of tunnels that leads to Lavinia's journal.

The journal reveals the woman was forcibly impregnated by her father during a ritual to Yog-Sothoth and gave birth to twin girls. Becca was put up for adoption while the other girl was born deformed and kept captive. Lavinia warns that once the two reunite and join hands, the gate to Yog-Sothoth will be opened.

The two are separated in the tunnels and The Professor comes across Becca's sibling. He successfully entreats her to teach him about the Elder Gods, which converts him to a member of the cult. During this period, the creature stalks the other guests, picking them off one by one and raping John.

Ultimately, only John is left alive to wander the tunnels. He discovers Marku captive and frees the man, who reveals that it was all a setup to bring the sisters together. Marku then attacks John, who kills him in self-defense and flees, but the creature attacks him. John is successful in defending himself and is about to kill the creature when Becca arrives and begs him to spare her. A horrified John starts hitting Becca, only for her to injure him and the creature finishes him off.

An overwhelmed Rebecca allows her sister to lead her to the ritual site, urged by the Professor to embrace her destiny. She takes her sister's hand, opening a gate to allow Yog-Sothoth into the world. Rebecca's body undergoes a monstrous transformation.

In an after credits sequence The Professor enters his office at the university, where he is identified as "Mr. Armitage". He then greets a man he calls "West" as a glowing vial sits on the desk.

== Cast ==
- Clair Catherine as Rebecca "Becca" Riley / Whateley
- Jake Horowitz as John
- Chris Galust as The Professor
- Genti Kame as Marku
- Omar Shariff Brunson Jr. as Larry
- Emily Sweet as Shelly
- Klodian Hoxha as Doctor
- Klodjana Keco as Old Timer
- Kika Magalhães as Lavinia Whateley

== Production ==
On April 15, 2018, it was announced that Cinestate and Charles Band would be producing a remake/reboot of Castle Freak, along with the film's original star Barbara Crampton also producing and special effects artist Tate Steinsiek set to direct. Announcing his involvement with the project on Instagram, Steinsiek wrote, "It's such an honor to be taking not only a Stuart Gordon classic but also embracing the world of Lovecraft." Crampton later announced that the film would feature an "Expanded Lovecraft Universe", with some elements from the first film, while introducing many new characters.

== Release ==
Castle Freak was initially intended to screen at the Chattanooga Film Festival on April 16, 2020, however plans were altered due to the COVID-19 pandemic and the film festival was held online. The film debuted on Shudder on December 3, 2020, followed by a release to VOD and digital HD on December 4, 2020.

== Reception ==
=== Critical response ===
JoBlo.com's Arrow in the Head wrote that they wished that Castle Freak had been more ambitious, criticizing the characters as one dimensional and unlikeable while also noting that the movie's kills were satisfying. It was also reviewed by Gruesome Magazine. Culture Crypt rated the movie as 55/100, writing that "Castle Freak 2020 reminded me what Full Moon movies were like at their height, with silly storylines, shoddy yet sincere craftsmanship, and midnight movie charm. For me, I appreciate Castle Freak for momentarily bringing back those memories, even though I don't have one of the original."
