= R. J. Haddy =

American special effects artist

Robert J. Haddy II is a special effects artist and airbrush dealer. He is best known as a contestant on season 2 of Syfy's reality television game show, Face Off in which he was a finalist and fan favorite for the season. He returned as a veteran contestant on season 5 of Face Off, but was eliminated in episode 5.

== Biography ==
Haddy is a native of Charleston, West Virginia, and is a graduate of Capital High School. He attended several colleges, including West Virginia State College (now University), The Art Institute of Fort Lauderdale, the Joe Blasco Make-Up Center in Hollywood, UCLA Extension, and Santa Monica College. While at the Joe Blasco Make-Up Center, Haddy worked for Alterian Studios under Tony Gardner, which allowed him to work on films such as Batman & Robin, There's Something About Mary, and Contact. Haddy later returned to Charleston to Capital High School, where he taught television production, writing and performance for the camera, special effects, web and app design, and filmmaking. He also wrote and designed the curriculum.

=== Face Off ===
After the first season of Syfy's reality television game show Face Off, Haddy auditioned for season 2 at San Diego Comic-Con in 2011. Winning the final spot on the show after competing against two other potential contestants, he finished as one of the runners-up. Soon afterward, Haddy left teaching to work full-time as a special-effects artist while running an e-commerce site selling airbrush equipment, including his own Shadow line of brushes.

Haddy returned for Face Off season 5 as one of eight veterans competing against eight rookies. He was eliminated in episode 5 where the contestants had to create a Mother-Nature inspired goddess with attributes of their own mothers.
