= Clash of the Gods (TV series) =

- Cover of the DVD
- Genre: Mythology / Ancient Greece / Scandinavia
- Created by: History Channel
- Narrated by: Stan Bernard
- Theme music composer: Chris Stangroom
- Country of origin: United States
- Original language: English
- No. of seasons: 1
- No. of episodes: 10

Production
- Executive producers: Bill Hunt, Vincent Kralyevich
- Running time: 60 minutes (with commercials)

Original release
- Network: History
- Release: August 3 – October 12, 2009

Clash of the Gods is a one-hour weekly mythology television series that premiered on August 3, 2009 on the History Channel. The program covers many of the ancient Greek and Norse Gods, monsters and heroes including Hades, Hercules, Medusa, Minotaur, Odysseus and Zeus.

== Episodes ==
| No. | Title | Original release date |
|---|---|---|
| 1 | "Zeus" | August 3, 2009 |
The story of Zeus and how he escaped being swallowed by his father Cronus, led the Olympians to defeat the Titans and gained control of the universe. The ancient volcanic blast on Santorini is posited as the site of Titanomachy. According to local legend, the Titan god Typhon was pushed into the abyss at Mount Etna on Sicily. Dion was a city built at the basis of Mount Olympus. The Greek word "Zeus" turned into "theos" (Koine Greek) and "theus" and finally into the Latin word Deus for "god." Zeus suddenly swallows his own first wife-goddess Metis. Needing a new wife, Zeus marries his sister goddess Hera. The dalliances of Zeus annoy Hera very much; his divine and semi-divine children are numerous.
| 2 | "Hercules" | August 10, 2009 |
Hercules, the strongest man in the world, murdered his family in a fit of rage. To atone for this crime, the Oracle of Delphi advises Hercules to seek the path of penance from the foxy king Eurystheus who is acting as Hera's agent. Next, Hercules embarks on a path of 12 difficult and dangerous labours. Following his earthly death, Hercules achieves apotheosis (becomes a Greek god) and joins his father Zeus on Mount Olympus.
| 3 | "Hades" | August 17, 2009 |
Hades is the lord of the underworld and the keeper of dead souls. This episode tells how Hades came to this position, why he was so feared, and what the Greeks thought awaited them after death. It also contains the myths of Persephone, Sisyphus, and Orpheus. In the Christian New Testament, which was written in Greek, Jesus defeats "Hades" (per the original Greek text).
| 4 | "The Minotaur" | August 24, 2009 |
Poseidon caused the wife of King Minos of Crete, Pasiphae, to lust after a bull on the Island of Crete. The Minotaur was a flesh-eating monster, half-man and half-bull (the result of Queen Pasiphae mating with a bull), that lived in the labyrinth beneath the palace of King Minos. Every 9 years, seven youths and seven maidens were chosen from Athens to be sacrificed to the Minotaur (after the death of his son). Until a heroic demigod named Theseus braved the labyrinth and killed the beast. Today, an underground cave in Messara Plain resembles the labyrinth. Androgeus (son of Minos) was the half-brother of the Minotaur.
| 5 | "Medusa" | August 31, 2009 |
Unlike most Greek gods and goddesses who married, the goddess Athena was among a handful of virgin goddesses. Based on this logic, the priestesses of Athena were also expected to take a vow of chastity. Parthenon means "place of the virgin." Medusa was once a beautiful priestess of Athena until her vow of chastity was broken by Poseidon raping her. Refusing to punish Poseidon, Athena turns her wrath on Medusa and transforms her into a Gorgon, a monster so hideous that any person who saw her turned to stone. King of Argos Acrisius wanted to kill his grandson Perseus. The demi-god Perseus goes on a journey where he ends up killing Medusa. Algol appears as a bright light, but it is actually a binary star (two stars) in the constellation Perseus.
| 6 | "Odysseus: Curse of the Sea" | September 14, 2009 |
Odysseus, king of Ithaca, leaves his wife and son to fight in the Trojan War. After the Greeks' victory, he attempts to sail home, but has to face many challenges. On the way back from Troy, Odysseus first stops in Ismarus (Thrace). After defeating a Cyclops on Sicily, the beast asks his father, Poseidon, to curse Odysseus. The story is continued in the following episode.
| 7 | "Odysseus: Warrior's Revenge" | September 21, 2009 |
Odysseus continues his journey across the chaotic sea, confronting sorceresses, sea, and monsters. To fight off the seductive sorcery of Circe, Hermes gives him Moly (herb). Odysseus takes even a journey into Hades itself to rendezvous with Tiresias. Scylla is a man-eating sea monster while Charybdis is a massive whirlpool in the sea. Ogygia is the Island on which Odysseus runs into the nymph Calypso. There, he carries on his tryst with Calypso for seven years! Nevertheless, Odysseus declines Calypso's promise of immortality because he wants to return to his family. Finally, he is able to reach his wife before she is forced to marry another.
| 8 | "Beowulf" | September 28, 2009 |
The Norse saga of Beowulf, who battles with Grendel and other monsters. Excavations at Sutton Hoo have unearthed evidence of the myths in Beowulf. Heorot was the banquet hall of king Hrothgar; accounts of this king are found in the Legendary sagas. Circa 600, Pope Gregory I sends Christian Romans to Britain led by Augustine of Canterbury. Geats were in the southern part of modern Sweden. The dragon (Beowulf) is like Smaug as both love golden treasures.
| 9 | "Tolkien's Monsters" | October 5, 2009 |
About J. R. R. Tolkien's The Lord of the Rings trilogy and how both legends such as the Völsunga saga and real life influenced it. The One Ring is the master ring controlling all other rings. Tolkien studied the Kalevala which includes dwarves and elves.
| 10 | "Thor" | October 12, 2009 |
About the Norse thunder god Thor and his nemesis, the Midgard Serpent. When Inge the Elder came to power in Scandinavia, most of his subject still worshipped Thor. Unlike the Christian god, Thor is not an all-knowing god; thus, he can be deceived, tricked, and even defeated.

== Cast ==
- Stan Bernard - Narrator
- Tate Steinsiek - Minotaur
- Greg Ford - Hades
- Blair Jones - Theseus
- Joseph Beddelam - Zeus
- Stanislav Adamickij - Hercules

== Mythologists ==
- Scott A. Mellor, University of Wisconsin
- Tracey-Anne Cooper, St. John's University
- John Rennie, Scientific American
- David George, Saint Anselm College
- Dimitira Fimi, Cardiff University
- Michael Drout, Wheaton College

== Home media ==
Clash of the Gods: The Complete Season 1 DVD Set was released on February 16, 2010. The Blu-ray version was released on March 16, 2010.
