= Face Off season 2 =

Face Off
- Season 2
- No. of episodes: 10

Release
- Original network: Syfy
- Original release: January 11 – March 14, 2012

Season chronology
- ← Previous; Season 1 Next → Season 3

The second season of the Syfy reality television series Face Off premiered on January 11, 2012 and ended on March 14, 2012. The season featured 14 prosthetic makeup artists competing in a series of challenges to create makeup effects. The winner of this season, Rayce Bird of Shelley, Idaho, received US$100,000 cash, US$25,000 worth of makeup from Alcone, and the 2012 Toyota Camry Hybrid.

The season 2 premiere episode posted the best ratings performance for any Syfy original series since November 2009.

== Judges ==
- Glenn Hetrick
- Ve Neill
- Patrick Tatopoulos
- McKenzie Westmore (Host)

== Contestants ==
Name	Age	Hometown	Place finished
Greg Lightner	35	Pittsburgh, Pennsylvania	14th
Nicholas "Nix" Herrera	31	Orlando, Florida	13th
Miranda Jory	21	Seattle, Washington	12th
Brea Joseph	32	San Diego, California	11th
Athena Zhe	25	New York City, New York	10th
Heather Henry	33	Dallas, Texas	9th
Tara Lang	27	Littleton, Colorado	8th
Jerry Macaluso	43	Fort Lauderdale, Florida	7th
Beki Ingram	30	Hibbing, Minnesota	6th
Sue Lee	26	New York City, New York	5th/4th
Matt Valentine	33	Austin, Texas	5th/4th
Robert "RJ" Haddy	36	Charleston, West Virginia	Runner-Up
Ian Cromer	22	Tampa, Florida	Runner-up
Rayce Bird	29	Shelley, Idaho	Winner

== Production ==
Guest judges for the season include Asher Roth, Tom Savini, Catherine O'Hara, Sam Huntington, Vivica A. Fox and LeVar Burton.

== Contestant progress ==
Contestant		Episode									
Contestant		1	2	3	4	5	6	7	8	9	10
1	Rayce	HIGH	IN	HIGH	HIGH	HIGH	IN‡	HIGH	WIN	WIN	WINNER
2	Ian	HIGH	LOW	LOW	WIN	HIGH	LOW	WIN	LOW	IN	RUNNER-UP
2	RJ	IN	LOW	IN	IN	WIN	HIGH	HIGH	HIGH	IN	RUNNER-UP
4	Matt	IN	WIN	WIN	IN	IN	IN	IN	HIGH	OUT	
4	Sue	IN	IN	IN	IN	LOW	WIN	LOW	LOW	OUT	
6	Beki	HIGH	IN	HIGH‡	HIGH	LOW‡	LOW	IN	OUT		
7	Jerry	IN‡	LOW	LOW	LOW	IN	HIGH	OUT			
8	Tara	HIGH	HIGH	LOW	IN	LOW	IN	OUT			
9	Heather	LOW	HIGH	IN	IN	HIGH	OUT				
10	Athena	IN	HIGH	IN	LOW	OUT					
11	Brea	WIN	IN	HIGH	OUT						
12	Miranda	LOW	IN	OUT							
13	Nix	LOW	OUT								
14	Greg	OUT									

The contestant won Face Off.
The contestant was a runner-up.
The contestant won a Spotlight Challenge.
The contestant was part of a team that won the Spotlight Challenge.
The contestant was in the top in the Spotlight Challenge.
The contestant was declared one of the best in the Spotlight Challenge but was not in the running for the win.
The contestant was in the bottom in the Spotlight Challenge but was exempt from being eliminated.
The contestant was in the bottom in the Spotlight Challenge.
The contestant was a teammate of the eliminated contestant in the Spotlight Challenge.
The contestant was deemed the least successful in the Spotlight Challenge and was eliminated..
The contestant was deemed the second least successful in the Spotlight Challenge and was eliminated alongside another contestant.
‡ The contestant won the Foundation Challenge.

== Episodes ==
No. overall	No. in season	Title	Original release date	Viewers (millions)	Rating (18-49)
9	1	"Return to Oz"	January 11, 2012	1.972	0.9
Foundation Challenge: Create a character representing themselves as an artist using items from three trailers (costume, prop, and prosthetic) on the Universal Studios back-lot.; Guest Judge: Ve Neil and Conor McCullagh Reward: Immunity Top Foundations: Jerry RJ Bottom Foundations Brea Nix Winner: Jerry: Spotlight Challenge: In teams of men against women and using a cohesive theme, reimagine the iconic characters from L. Frank Baum's The Wonderful Wizard of Oz: the Scarecrow, the Tin Woodman, the Cowardly Lion, and the Wicked Witch of the West.; Reward: Choice of team in next week's Spotlight Challenge Winning Team: Women Top Looks: Brea & Beki (Wicked Witch of the West, post-apocalyptic/tribal theme) Tara (Scarecrow, post-apocalyptic/tribal theme) Ian & Rayce (Cowardly Lion, horror theme) Safe: Matt & RJ (Scarecrow, horror theme) Sue & Athena (Cowardly Lion, post-apocalyptic/tribal theme) Jerry (Wicked Witch of the West, horror theme) Bottom Looks: Heather & Miranda (Tin Woodman, post-apocalyptic/tribal theme) Greg & Nix (Tin Woodman, horror theme) Winner: Brea Eliminated: Greg
10	2	"Water World"	January 18, 2012	1.808	0.8
Spotlight Challenge: Choose a sea creature and use it as inspiration for a water-proof makeup.; Top Looks: Matt & Tara (Lyretail fairy basslet) Heather & Athena (Lionfish) Safe: Miranda & Beki (Leafy sea dragon) Sue, Rayce, & Brea (Leafy sea dragon) Bottom Looks: Jerry & Nix (Ridley sea turtle) Ian & RJ (Zebra shark) Winner: Matt Eliminated: Nix
11	3	"Rock Your Body"	January 25, 2012	1.690	0.8
Foundation Challenge: In teams of 3, create a make-up based only on the contact lenses of the model. Only one artist works on the model at a time, and the others do not see the work until they have their turn in a relay race-like switch.; Guest Judge: Jennifer Aspinall Reward: Immunity Beki Ian Rayce Winner: Beki (alien): Spotlight Challenge: In teams of two, apply body paint to two nude models and incorporate them to a selected background for a photo shoot to be used as the cover for hip hop musician and guest judge Asher Roth's album Is This Too Orange?; one model has to blend in with the background, while the other is a character interacting with the background, and each artist can only work one model.; Guest Judge: Asher Roth Top Looks: Rayce & Beki (Farm With Noose) Brea^{a} & Matt (Wall of Sneakers) Safe: Sue & Heather (Elephant Skateboarding) RJ & Athena (Swimming Pool) Bottom Looks: Jerry & Tara (Brick Wall) Ian & Miranda (Picnic Table) Winner: Matt Eliminated: Miranda
12	4	"Night Terrors"	February 1, 2012	2.144	0.9
Spotlight Challenge: After visiting the Linda Vista Community Hospital in complete darkness in the middle of the night where they sketch their designs, the contestants must create a horror movie villain based on a phobia.; Guest Judge: Tom Savini Top Looks: Ian^{b} - Odontophobia: fear of teeth Beki - Parasitophobia: fear of parasites Rayce - Cryophobia: fear of ice and frost Safe: RJ - Xyrophobia: fear of razor blades Heather - Ornithophobia: fear of birds Tara - Ommetaphobia: fear of eyes Sue - Hadephobia: fear of Hell Matt - Xerophobia: fear of dryness Bottom Looks: Athena - Merinthophobia: fear of being bound Jerry - Electrophobia: fear of electricity Brea - Chemophobia: fear of chemicals Winner: Ian Eliminated: Brea
13	5	"Dangerous Beauty"	February 8, 2012	2.198	1.0
Foundation Challenge: Create a trauma makeup that makes it appear that someone was attacked by a werewolf.; Guest Judge: Sam Huntington Reward: Immunity Top Foundations: Beki Heather Winner: Beki: Spotlight Challenge: In teams of two, the artists must create an original creature that is both beautiful and deadly using one plant and one animal in the studio as inspiration.^{c}; Guest Judge: Vivica A. Fox Top Looks: RJ & Ian - Lady slipper orchid & Panther chameleon Heather & Rayce - Firesticks & Harlequin water monitor Safe: Jerry & Matt - Yellow iris & African leopard Bottom Looks: Athena & Tara - Stargazer lily & Emerald tree boa Beki & Sue Bird of paradise & Cobalt blue tarantula Winner: RJ Eliminated: Athena
14	6	"Triple Threat"	February 15, 2012	2.036	0.9
Foundation Challenge: Immediately after the previous episode's spotlight challenge, the contestants are each given a runway model and give them a head to toe make-under so she looks like a "plain Jane".; Guest Judge: Kim Greene Reward: Immunity Top Foundations: Ian Jerry Rayce Winner: Rayce: Spotlight Challenge: In teams of three, make an old-age makeup to age a set of triplets, one to 50 years old, one to 75 years old, and another to 100 years old.; Guest Judge: Greg Cannom Top Looks: Sue - 100 yr old (Tindal triplet) RJ^{d} - 75 yr old (Green triplet)^{e} Jerry - 100 yr old (Hornbeck triplet) Safe: Matt - 50 yr old (Tindal triplet) Tara - 75 yr old (Tindal triplet) Rayce - 50 yr old (Hornbeck triplet) Bottom Looks: Ian - 75 yr old (Hornbeck triplet) Beki - 50 yr old (Green triplet)^{e} Heather - 100 yr old (Green triplet)^{e} Winner: Sue Eliminated: Heather
15	7	"Alien Interpreters"	February 22, 2012	1.729	0.8
Spotlight Challenge: Take one of Patrick Tatopoulos' conceptual sketches and use it to create an original alien makeup.; Guest Judge: LeVar Burton Reward: Tickets to the premiere of Total Recall Top Looks: Rayce (Cyborg with tubes) Ian (Bat-like creature) RJ (Winged lizard) Safe Matt (Long-armed gremlin) Beki (Cyborg with tubes) Bottom Looks: Sue (Bat-like creature) Jerry (Winged lizard) Tara (Long-armed gremlin) Winner: Ian Eliminated: Tara & Jerry
16	8	"Burtonesque"	February 29, 2012	1.781	0.9
Spotlight Challenge: After visiting the Watts Towers, contestants are to make a whimsical character worthy of being in a Tim Burton film using an ordinary occupation as inspiration.; Guest Judge: Catherine O'Hara Top Looks: Matt (Ice Cream Man) Rayce (Cellist) RJ (Bellhop) Bottom Looks: Sue (Toymaker) Beki (Chef/Baker) Ian (Plumber) Winner: Rayce Eliminated: Beki
17	9	"Dinoplasty"	March 7, 2012	2.266	1.0
Spotlight Challenge: After visiting the Natural History Museum of Los Angeles County for inspiration, contestants are to make an original human-dinosaur hybrid.; Guest Mentors: Cleve Hall and Constance Hall from Monster Man Winner: Rayce - Corythosaurus Safe: Ian - Triceratops RJ - Velociraptor Eliminated Matt - Carnotaurus Sue - Tianyulong
18	10	"The Ultimate Spotlight Challenge"	March 14, 2012	2.465	1.1
Spotlight Challenge: Create three original characters, using either horror, science fiction, or fantasy as a theme, that will perform a dance routine choreographed by Lindsey & Craig to the track "Cinema" by Benny Benassi featuring Gary Go at the Alex Theatre in Glendale.; Guest Judge: Michael Westmore Rayce^{f}, assisted by Jerry, Miranda, & Heather (Sci-Fi) Ian, assisted by Matt, Sue, & Tara (Horror) RJ, assisted by Beki, Athena, & Brea (Fantasy) Winner: Rayce

== Footnotes ==
1. Brea's model for the Spotlight Challenge passed out and was taken to the hospital. She was given a new model to work with and was allowed to perform the same body painting on the new model. He was later superimposed over the photo taken of Matt's model and their backdrop.
2. Ian's model had a bad reaction to the makeup and left the reveal stage after judging.
3. Other animals provided to the contestants included a white rhinoceros and gray wolves
4. RJ's model had a bad reaction to the makeup and was replaced with a model who was unrelated to the models on his team.
5. One of the Greens was a fraternal triplet to the other two identicals.
6. Rayce's trio of makeups was the audience favorite, something that would be taken into consideration when the judges made their final decision.
