= Face Off season 4 =

Face Off
- Season 4
- No. of episodes: 11

Release
- Original network: Syfy
- Original release: January 15 – March 26, 2013

Season chronology
- ← Previous; Season 3 Next → Season 5

The fourth season of the Syfy reality television series Face Off premiered on January 15, 2013 and ended on March 26, 2013. The season featured 14 prosthetic makeup artists competing against each other to create makeup effects. Anthony Kosar of Chicago, Illinois, was the winner of the season. The grand prize for the fourth season was a position as a guest lecturer at the Make Up For Ever Academies in New York and Paris, a 2013 Fiat 500, and $100,000.

The finals venue for this season was Wynn in Paradise, Nevada.

== Judges ==
- Ve Neill
- Glenn Hetrick
- Neville Page
- Michael Westmore (mentor)
- McKenzie Westmore (hostess)

== Contestants ==
Name	Age	Hometown	Place finished
Troy Rivers	34	Indianapolis, Indiana	14th
Michael Faust	31	Austin, Texas	13th
Katie Machaiek	26	Owls Head, Maine	12th
Alex McCoy	30	Orlando, Florida	11th
Jenna Green	40	Austin, Texas	10th
Alam Park	24	Seattle, Washington	9th
Autumn Cook	35	Pittsburgh, Pennsylvania	8th
Meagan Hester	29	Ossining, New York	7th
Eric Zapata	22	Austin, Texas	6th
David "House" Greathouse	41	Cleveland, Ohio	5th
Eric Fox	37	Riverside, California	4th
Kris Kobzina	41	El Segundo, California	Runner-up
Wayne Anderson	27	Fort Myers, Florida	Runner-up
Anthony Kosar	26	Chicago, Illinois	Winner

== Production ==
Syfy picked up Face Off for a fourth season on October 9, 2012, which premiered on January 15, 2013 after the third season became one of the network's highest rated programs along with its strong performance. A sneak peek of the upcoming season premiered during the live season 3 finale. Season 4 was the first season to create full on creature suites. Large fabrications and massive sculpting designs with crazy out of the box thinking.

Guests slated to appear are Bryan Singer, John Rhys-Davies, Jon Landau, Michael Nankin and Gale Anne Hurd, who previously served as a guest judge in season 3. McKenzie Westmore's father Michael Westmore joins this season as a mentor.

== Contestant progress ==
Contestant		Episode										
Contestant		1	2	3	4	5	6	7	8	9	10	11
1	Anthony	WIN‡	WIN	WIN	IN	HIGH	LOW	LOW	WIN	LOW	WIN	WINNER
2	Kris	IN	IN	IN	WIN	HIGH	WIN	WIN	IN	WIN	IN	RUNNER-UP
2	Wayne	LOW	IN	HIGH	IN	HIGH	HIGH	HIGH	HIGH	HIGH	IN	RUNNER-UP
4	Eric F.	HIGH	HIGH	HIGH	IN	WIN	IN‡	LOW	IN	IN	OUT	
5	House	IN	HIGH	IN	HIGH	HIGH	IN	HIGH	LOW	OUT		
6	Eric Z.	HIGH	IN	IN	IN‡	LOW	IN	LOW	OUT			
7	Meagan	HIGH	LOW	IN	IN	LOW	LOW	HIGH‡	OUT			
8	Autumn	HIGH	IN	LOW	LOW	HIGH	IN	OUT				
9	Alam	IN	IN	HIGH	HIGH	LOW	OUT					
10	Jenna	HIGH	IN	LOW	LOW	OUT						
11	Alex	LOW	IN	LOW	OUT							
12	Katie	IN	LOW	OUT								
13	Michael	LOW	OUT									
14	Troy	OUT										

The contestant won Face Off.
The contestant was a runner-up.
The contestant won a Spotlight Challenge.
The contestant won a Spotlight Challenge by default.
The contestant was part of a team that won the Spotlight Challenge.
The contestant was in the top in the Spotlight Challenge.
The contestant was deemed the best in the Spotlight Challenge but was not eligible for the win due to not completing the challenge.
The contestant was in the bottom in the Spotlight Challenge.
The contestant was a teammate of the eliminated contestant in the Spotlight Challenge.
The contestant was eliminated.
‡ The contestant won the Foundation Challenge.

== Episodes ==
No. overall	No. in season	Title	Original release date	U.S. viewers (millions)	18-49 Rating
31	1	"Make it Reign"	January 15, 2013	1.8	1.0
Foundation Challenge: On the RMS Queen Mary, the contestants must use a crown as inspiration for an original queen-themed make-up that represents them as an artist.; Guest Judge: Michael Westmore Reward: Immunity Top Foundations: Anthony Eric F. Jenna Winner: Anthony: Spotlight Challenge: Working in teams of two, the artists must create believable fantasy goblin kings based on one of seven terrains.; Guest Judge: John Rhys-Davies Top Looks: Anthony & Meagan - Mountain terrain Eric F. & Jenna - Desert terrain Eric Z. & Autumn - Jungle terrain Safe: Alam & Kris - Forest terrain House & Katie - Arctic terrain Bottom Looks: Michael & Troy - Volcanic terrain Wayne & Alex - Swamp terrain Winner: Anthony Eliminated: Troy
32	2	"Heroic Proportions"	January 22, 2013	1.756	0.7
Spotlight Challenge: While visiting the 2012 San Diego Comic Con, the remaining artists must create an original DC Comics superhero as well as working on their concept with several DC artists.; Guests: Dan DiDio, Jim Lee, Nicola Scott, Mark Buckingham, Cliff Chiang, Tony S. Daniel, David Finch, and J.H. Williams III Reward: The winning superhero will be featured in Justice League Dark #16. Top Looks: House - Robot Girl Eric F. - Dick Gritty Anthony - The Infernal Core Safe: Alam - Dark Shard Alex - H_{2}Ophelia Autumn - Mercury Ray Eric Z. - Contagion Jenna - Silversight Kris - Orion X Wayne - Solarian Bottom Looks: Meagan - Freedom Fighter Michael - Elijah: Bringer of the Plagues Katie - ReVolt Winner: Anthony Eliminated: Michael
33	3	"When Hell Freezes Over"	January 29, 2013	1.99	0.9
Spotlight Challenge: Working in teams of two, the artists must each create their own take on one of several demons from other cultures. They first make their sketches in the desert, with the heat as inspiration for the hellish nature of the demons, but when they returned to the lab they were given a script-note that read "Hell has frozen over", requiring them to incorporate ice themes in their design.; Top Looks: Anthony & Alam - Demus Wayne & Eric F. Chort Safe: Eric Z. & Kris - Abraxas House & Meagan - Azi Dahaka Bottom Looks: Alex & Autumn - Pazuzu Jenna & Katie - Eurynomos Winner: Anthony Eliminated: Katie
34	4	"Eye Candy"	February 5, 2013	1.8	0.7
Foundation Challenge: The artists must create a realistic beard for their female models.; Guest Judge: John Meyer Reward: Immunity Top Foundations: Alex Eric Z. Winner: Eric Z.: Spotlight Challenge: The artists must create an original character or creature, while incorporating candy as part of their designs.; Guest Judge: Will Cotton Top Looks: Alam - Anime-inspired princess Kris - Halloween candy monster House - Sweet Tooth Suzy Safe: Anthony - Colonel Candy Eric F. - Gummy glutton Eric Z. - Gingerbread house witch Meagan - Sugar Plum Fairy Wayne - Rock candy troll Bottom Looks: Alex - Slasher pageant girl Jenna - Sinister tooth fairy Autumn - Undead gummy bear Winner: Kris Eliminated: Alex
35	5	"Two Heads Are Better Than One"	February 12, 2013	1.74	0.8
Spotlight Challenge: The artists work in teams of two to create a larger-than-life giant character based on Jack the Giant Killer. Their character should have two or more heads.; Guest Judge: Bryan Singer Top Looks: Wayne & House - Two-headed tree-like giant with a puppet head Anthony & Autumn - Three-headed contorted giant Eric F. & Kris - Two-headed, 10' giant holding Jack Bottom Looks: Alam & Eric Z. - Three-headed axe-slayer with feet holding heads Jenna & Meagan - Two-headed ogre-like, "former" Jack Winner: Eric F. Eliminated: Jenna
36	6	"Bugging Out"	February 19, 2013	1.8	0.8
Foundation Challenge: The artists must re-imagine a classic female fairy tale character as a bad girl.^{a}; Guest Judge: Lijha Stewart Reward: Immunity and a makeup kit from the Make Up Forever collection. Top Foundations: Eric F. - Little Red Riding Hood Wayne - Little Miss Muffet Winner: Eric F.: Spotlight Challenge: The artists each chose an image which later turned out to be microscopic photographs of insects (and an arachnid). They must then create a make-up of their chosen insect while incorporating the microscopic details from their photos. At the end of judging, although the judges agreed that Wayne's makeup was the most successful overall, he was not eligible to win the challenge due to accidentally omitting the element from his microscopic photograph. So as the only other top look, Kris won by default.; Top Looks: Kris - Butterfly Wayne - Firefly Safe: Autumn - Beetle Eric F. - Wolf Spider Eric Z. - Mosquito House - Honeybee Bottom Looks: Anthony - Ant Meagan - Moth Alam - Grasshopper Winner: Kris Eliminated: Alam
37	7	"Howl at the Moon"	February 26, 2013	1.82	0.9
Foundation Challenge: Working in teams of two, the artists must apply zombie makeups on twenty people.; Guest Judge: Gale Anne Hurd Reward: Immunity Top Foundations: Anthony & Meagan Eric Z. & House Winner: Meagan: Spotlight Challenge: Working in teams of two, the artists must create alien werewolves from one of the other five planets in the Solar System that have moons.; Top Looks: House & Meagan - Mars Kris & Wayne - Neptune Bottom Looks: Eric F. & Anthony - Saturn Autumn & Eric Z. - Jupiter Winner: Kris Eliminated: Autumn
38	8	"It's Better in the Dark"	March 5, 2013	1.6	0.7
Spotlight Challenge: The artists must create an undiscovered creature from any ecosystem, but the creature must be bioluminescent and aspects of the make-up must glow under a blacklight.; Guest Judge: Jon Landau Top Looks: Anthony - Tribal creature with spear Wayne - Crab-man Safe: Eric F. - Jellyfish Kris - Green fish-amphibian Bottom Looks: House - Prehistoric fish-creature Meagan - Venus fly-trap from cave Eric Z. - Rock creature Winner: Anthony Eliminated: Meagan and Eric Z.
39	9	"Mummy Mayhem"	March 12, 2013	1.6	0.7
Spotlight Challenge: The artists must create an Egyptian god mummy inspired by the Evil Dead franchise.^{c}; Top Looks: Wayne - Sobek Kris - Khnum Safe: Eric F. - Ra Bottom Looks: Anthony - Anubis House - Thoth Winner: Kris Eliminated: House
40	10	"Alien Apocalypse"	March 19, 2013	1.6	0.8
Spotlight Challenge: The artists are tasked to create an original make-up that puts forth a possible hybrid offspring of two of the show's alien races from Defiance. Mackenzie and Defiance co-developer Kevin Murphy surprised them, except Eric F. who stayed behind due to family circumstances, with a trip to Toronto to visit the set in order to get inspiration for their look. On the way, they met Stephanie Leonidas, received a lesson from makeup artist Allan Cooke, and got to go behind the scenes.^{d}; Reward: Guaranteed spot in the finale. Winner: Anthony - Combination of Liberata + Mutant Safe: Kris - Combination of Bioman + Mutant Wayne - Combination of Liberata + Bioman Eliminated: Eric F. - Combination of Sensoth + 99ner
41	11	"Living the Dream"	March 26, 2013	1.77	0.8
Spotlight Challenge: The final three must choose a theme^{e} and create a waterproof makeup for a performance of Le Rêve at the Wynn in Paradise, Nevada; Anthony - assisted by Eric Z. & Autumn - used a Sinister theme Kris - assisted by House & Alam - used an Ethereal theme Wayne - assisted by Eric F. & Meagan - used a Supernatural theme Winner: Anthony

== Face Off Redemption ==
Face Off Redemption is a web miniseries hosted by judge Glenn Hetrick in conjunction with season 4. It puts the eliminated artists against each other with the winner getting a spot in Face Off's upcoming fifth season. This show reveals that Face Off will have a 5th season.

=== Webisode 1 ===
Artists Troy, Alex, Michael, and Katie must each create an alien emissary.

- Winner: Katie

=== Webisode 2 ===
Artists Katie, Jenna, Alam, and Autumn must each create a glam rock vampire.

- Winner: Jenna

=== Webisode 3 ===
Artists Jenna, Meagan, and Eric Z. must each create a nightmare clown.

- Winner: Eric Z.

=== Webisode 4 ===
In the final redemption challenge, artists Eric Z., Eric F., and House must each create an original mutant.

- Winner: Eric Z

.
