= Lilium 'Stargazer' =

Lily cultivar

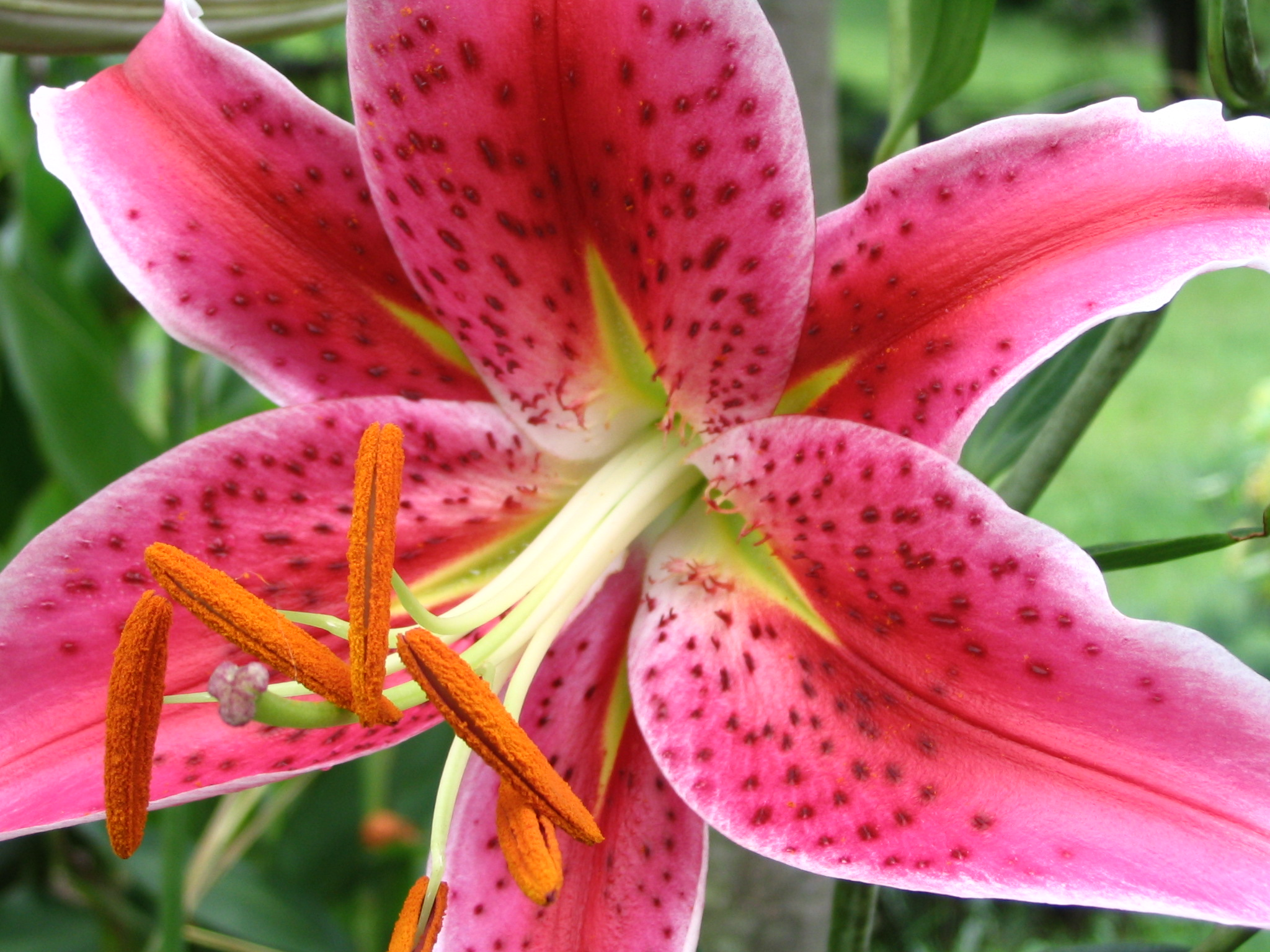
- Stargazer lily
- Genus: Lilium
- Species: Lilium orientalis
- Cultivar: 'Stargazer'
- Breeder: Leslie Woodriff, California in 1974

Lilium 'Stargazer' (the 'Stargazer lily') is a hybrid lily of the 'Oriental group', created in 1974 by Leslie Woodriff, a lily breeder in California. The new cross became known as 'Stargazer', because, unlike other Oriental lilies, the blooms faced towards the sky.

Oriental lilies are known for their fragrant perfume, and bloom in mid-to-late summer. 'Stargazers' are easy to grow and do best in full sunlight. They have a fast growth rate and prefer well-drained loamy or sandy soil. 'Stargazers' can grow to a height of 36 inches with a spread of 12 to 16 inches with 4 to 5 flowers per stem.

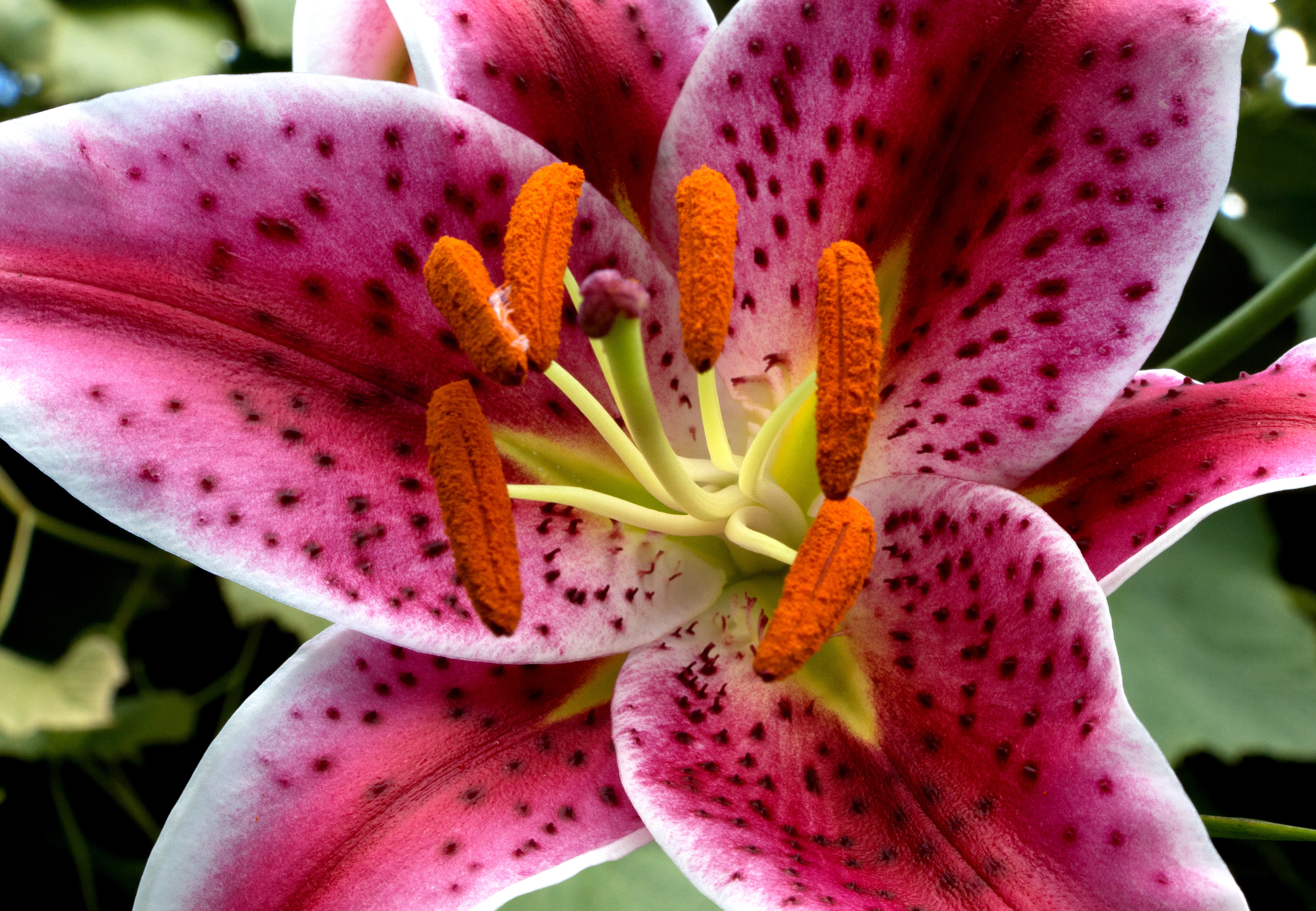

'Stargazer' lilies are toxic to cats, causing vomiting, changes in appetite, lethargy, kidney failure, and even death. The Society of American Florists, a floral industry umbrella organization, recommends keeping lilies out of the reach of cats. Lilies do not pose a problem for other pets or humans.

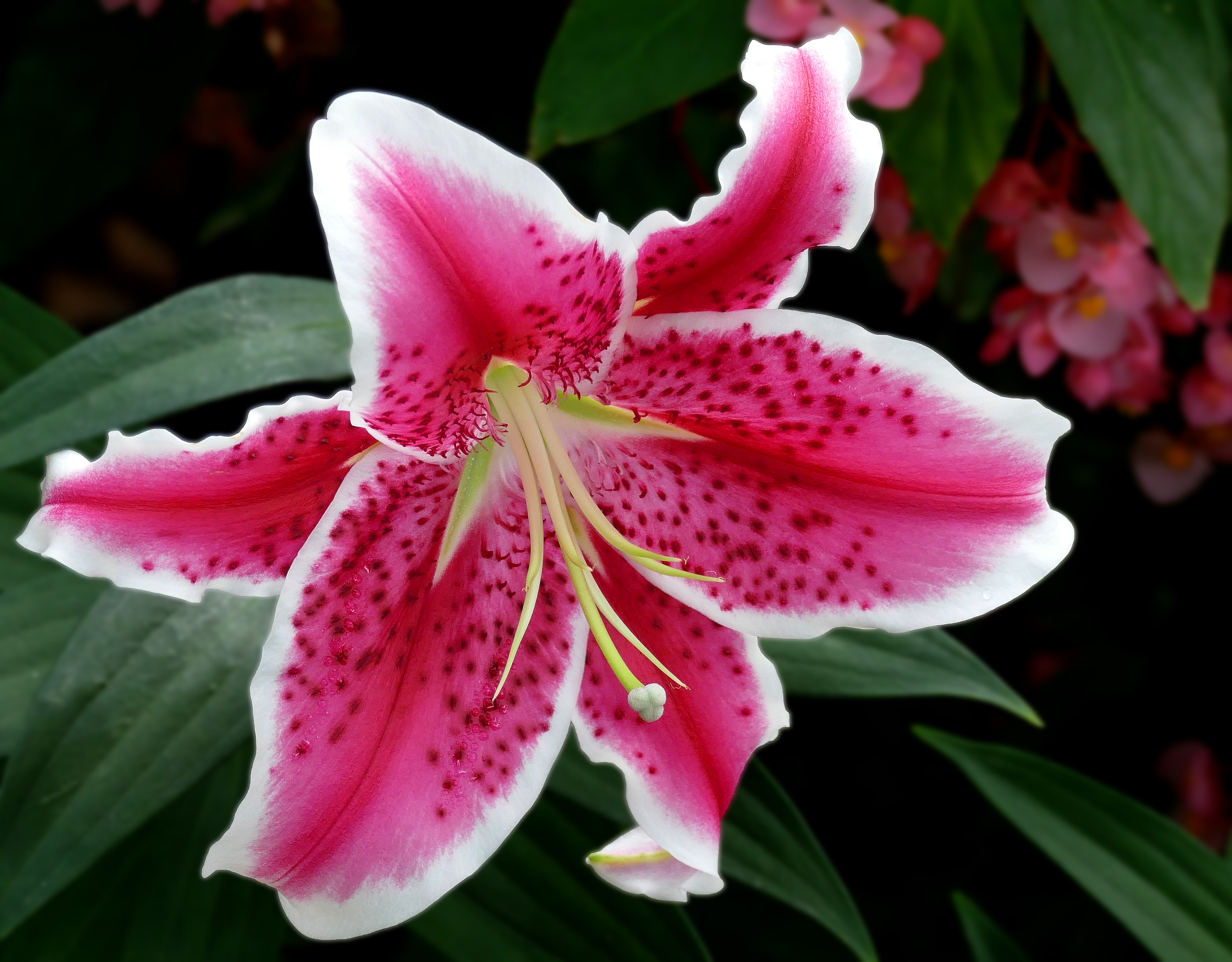
Lilium Oriental hybrid -- Lilium orientalis - 'Stargazer'
