= Cirque Berzerk =

Acrobatic show

Cirque Berzerk is an American acrobatics show. The show was conceived by Kevin Bourque and Suzanne Down (Bernel) at the 2004 Burning Man festival.

Bourque and Down had previously toured the US and Asia in a performance band called Mutaytor. Suzanne Down (Bernel) was an aerial acrobat, fire-eater and dancer.

In 2008, Bourque and Down produced the first Cirque Berzerk show with choreographer Neal Everett and David Berrent. It was staged in a tent with 1,600 seats at the Los Angeles State Historic Park. This first show was titled Beneath. It featured fire breathers, a nightmarish clown on stilts, contortionists and burlesque dancers. Bourque played the lead role as Death as he welcomed the audience into his gothic underworld. The show was adult content.

In 2009, Cirque Bezerk moved to Club Nokia with 2,300 seats for a 6-week run. Some reviews suggested that the stage was just barely large enough for some of the bigger acts.

== Music ==
The Cirque Bezerk music is composed by Bourque and performed by a live band during the show. The band included Johnny Avila from Oingo Boingo. After the show, Vaud and the Villains would play on an outdoor stage while the performers mingled with the crowd.

The soundtrack was written to help tell the story of a woman's descent into Death's Cabaret in the underworld. The song “Death’s Cabaret” was co-written with bassist John Avila and inspired by Rosin Coven.

Musicians included:

- John Avila, Bass Player
- Alpheus Underhill, Drummer
- Andrew Hayhurst, Cellist

Singers included:

- Antonia Bath
- Tigre Fisher
- Gretchen McNeil
