= Neville Page =

Film makeup artist

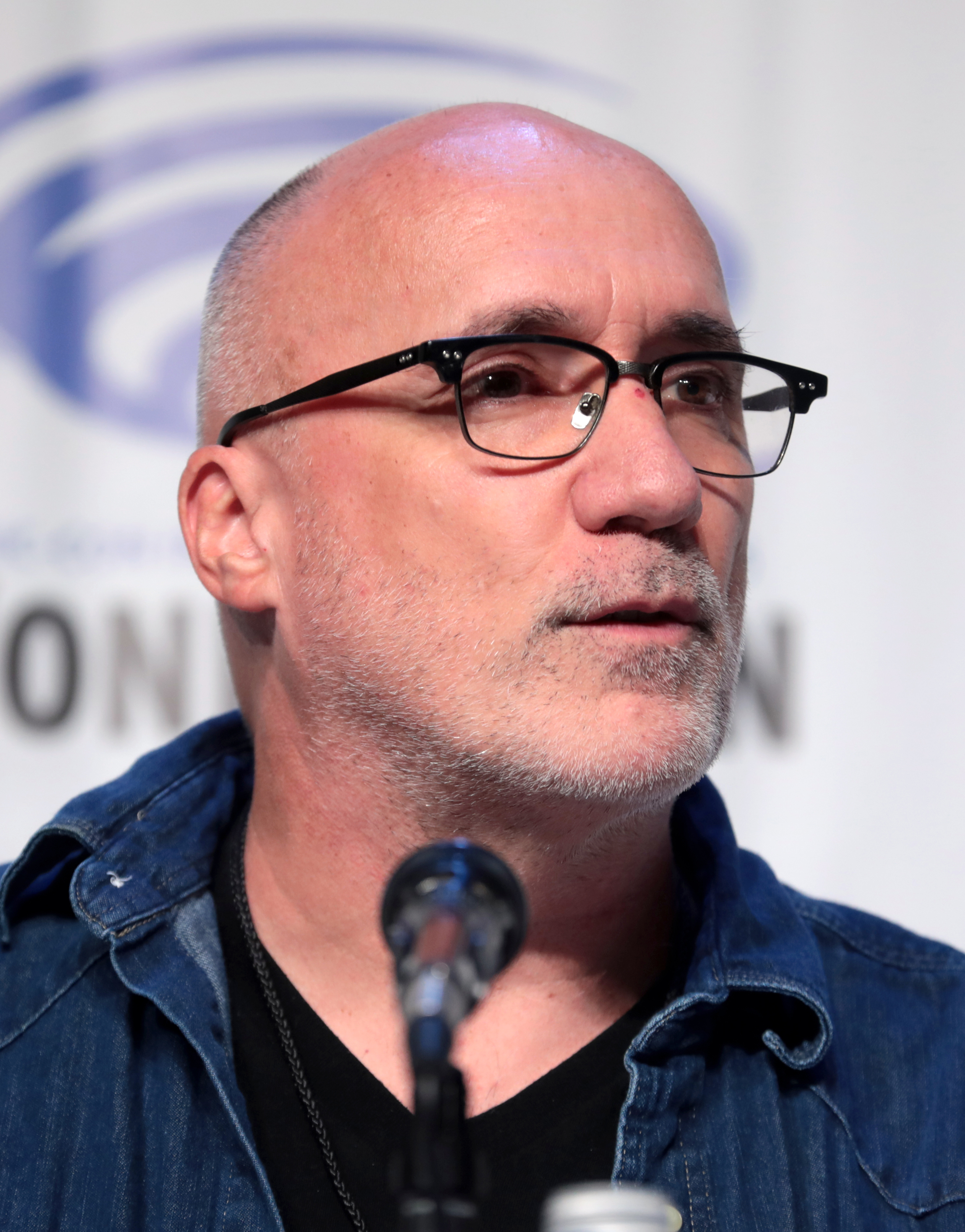
- Page at the 2022 WonderCon
- Born: 1964 or 1965 (age 61–62); England
- Education: Art Center College of Design
- Occupations: Film and television creature and concept designer
- Years active: 1990 – present
- Known for: Judge on SyFy television series Face Off
- Notable work: Avatar, Cloverfield, Star Trek, TRON: Legacy
- Awards: ADG Excellence in Production Design Award (nominated)
- Website: www.nevillepage.me

Neville Page is a British-American film and television creature and concept designer. Born in England, he was raised in Manchester, and Chicago, Illinois. He was inspired by science fiction, including Star Wars, and makeup artist Rick Baker's work in An American Werewolf in London. He graduated from Santana High School, Santee California, in 1983. Page moved to Hollywood at the age of 17, and gained roles as an actor. He graduated with honors in 1990 from the Art Center College of Design with a degree in industrial design, and went on to teach students in Switzerland. He focused his work on design consulting along with business partner Scott Robertson.

Page has worked as a concept designer on films, including Super 8, Watchmen, Star Trek, Tron: Legacy, Cloverfield, and Avatar. In 2010 his works were featured in an exhibit titled "From Page to Screen: Character and Creature Design of Neville Page" at the Oceanside Museum of Art. He joined the panel of judges on the SyFy television series Face Off for its third season alongside Ve Neill and Glenn Hetrick, replacing Patrick Tatopoulos. His works were again featured at the Oceanside Museum of Art in 2012 in an exhibit titled "The Beauty in the Beast: Crafting Creatures by Neville Page", which highlighted his designs in films, including Green Lantern, Prometheus, and Tron: Legacy.

== Early life ==
Neville was born in England, and grew up in Manchester, England. He was later raised in Chicago, Illinois. He grew up around artistic influences; his parents worked as performers in the circus. From an early age he was motivated to pursue a career in science fiction due to his appreciation for Star Wars. Page was inspired by makeup artist Rick Baker and his film work, including An American Werewolf in London.

At the age of 17, Page moved to Hollywood to further employment in acting. He gained minor roles on soap operas, including General Hospital. He took coursework at the Art Center College of Design, and in 1989 for a class on product-design he created a machine apparatus similar to that used by the character portrayed by Sigourney Weaver in the film Aliens. He received his degree in industrial design from that institution with honors in 1990. Following his graduation, Page instructed students at the Switzerland location of the Art Center College of Design. Along with his studio partner Scott Robertson, he began work in the field of design consulting.

== Career ==
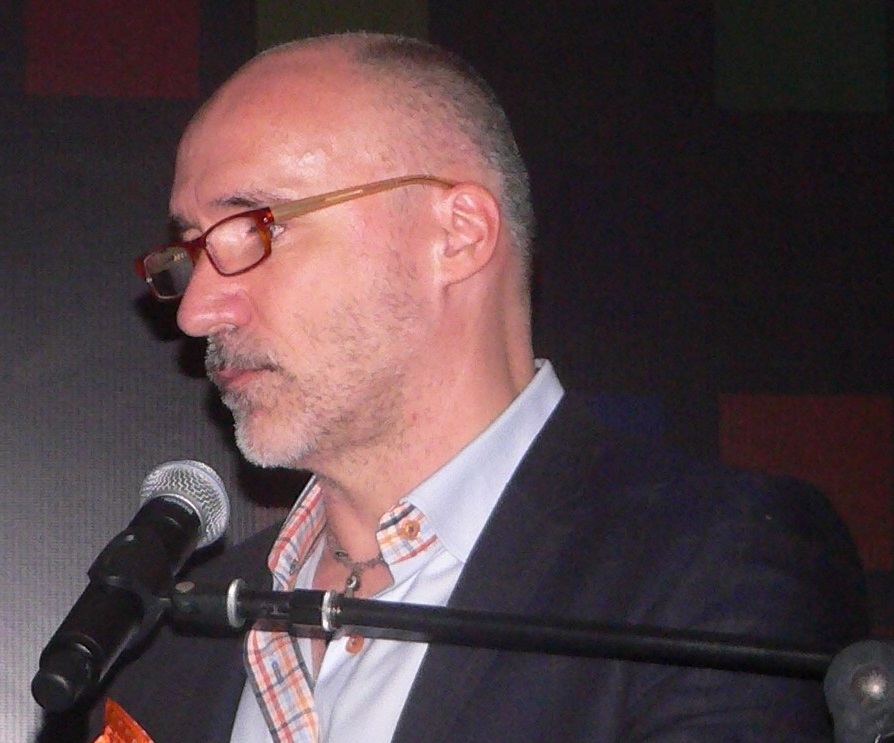
Page at the 2014 Comic Con Experience in São Paulo, Brazil.

Neville instructs students at the Gnomon School of Visual Effects in Hollywood, in addition to the Art Center College of Design, in Pasadena, California.

He has worked as a concept designer on films, including Watchmen, Star Trek, TRON: Legacy, Cloverfield, and Avatar. Cloverfield director Matt Reeves noted they hired Page to design the "creature" that appears in the film, commenting, "We would go into his office and he would have what I affectionately referred to as his 'Wall of Terror.' On the wall were all sorts of bits of color, and as you got closer suddenly your interest turned to revulsion because those pictures were like pictures of intestines and eyeballs and pieces of animals. What he was doing was having a biological, evolutionary basis for every aspect of the creature."

From July through August 2010, the Oceanside Museum of Art held an exhibition on Page. Titled: "From Page to Screen: Character and Creature Design of Neville Page", featuring works by Page, including pencil drawings, three-dimensional models, and digital creations. Page said he hoped the exhibit would educate the public about a different facet to filmmaking, "The general public tends to associate films with actors versus people who conceive and design and make the films. What is on display is one small facet of what it takes to make a movie, one of the many gears involved in the mechanism, neither more important nor less ... simply as important."

Neville has served as a judge on the SyFy television series Face Off. He joined the judging panel on Face Off in season three, which launched in August 2012. His fellow judges included Ve Neill and Glenn Hetrick. Page returned for the fourth season in 2013. In October 2012, Page returned to the Oceanside Museum of Art, with an exhibition titled, "The Beauty in the Beast: Crafting Creatures by Neville Page". The exhibit which ran for ten weeks featured 45 works by Page from films, including Green Lantern, Prometheus, and TRON: Legacy. He was the creature designer for the 2013 American science fiction action film Star Trek Into Darkness.

== Reception ==
In the 2011 book Star Wars vs. Star Trek: Could the Empire Kick the Federation's Ass? And Other Galaxy-Shaking Enigmas, author Matt Forbeck characterized Neville Page as a "creature guru". Cloverfield director Matt Reeves spoke highly of his work with Page, "... he is a genius." Reeves characterized Page's work on the "creature" in the film, "It developed in many different ways, and it came down to what Neville was doing, which was amazing."

The North County Times referred to him observing, "Page is one of the most recognizable artists in the entertainment industry for his iconic designs." Director of exhibitions and collections at the Oceanside Museum of Art, Teri Sowell, reflected of the exhibition featuring Page's work to The San Diego Union-Tribune, "These creatures are so embedded in our minds, we take them for granted. It's really handcrafted art." Film director J. J. Abrams commented on Page's work on his film Super 8, "the designer of the creature, Neville Page, did an amazing job and I think he gave us something that took a ton of iterations but he really nailed it".

== Filmography ==
=== Film ===
Year	Film	Role	Director
2000	Men in Black: Alien Attack	Creature design	David C. Cobb, Lyonal Coleman, Linda Hassani
2001	Planet of the Apes	Props	Tim Burton
2002	Minority Report	Concept designer	Steven Spielberg
2004	Garfield: The Movie	Character development	Peter Hewitt
2005	Fantastic Four	Props	Tim Story
2005	The Chronicles of Narnia: The Lion, the Witch and the Wardrobe	Creature designer	Andrew Adamson
2006	Superman Returns	Costume illustrator	Bryan Singer
2008	Cloverfield	Creature designer	Matt Reeves
2009	Watchmen	Creature designer	Zack Snyder
2009	Star Trek	Character designer; Head creature designer; Actor: Romulan crew member	J. J. Abrams
2009	Avatar	Lead creature designer	James Cameron
2010	Piranha 3D	Creature designer	Alexandre Aja
2010	TRON: Legacy	Lead concept artist	Joseph Kosinski
2010	Just Wright	Actor: Jellyfish Documentary Narrator	Sanaa Hamri
2011	Super 8	Creature designer	J. J. Abrams
2011	Green Lantern	Lead creature designer	Martin Campbell
2012	Prometheus	Concept artist	Ridley Scott
2013	Oblivion	Concept art	Joseph Kosinski
2013	Star Trek Into Darkness	Lead creature designer	J. J. Abrams
2014	Noah	Creature and character designer	Darren Aronofsky
2016	Star Trek Beyond	Creature designer	Justin Lin
2023	65	Dinosaur Consultant	Scott Beck, Bryan Woods
TBA	The Last Time	Creature designer	Shane Brady

=== Television ===
Year	Title	Role	Notes
2011	Terra Nova	Creature and character designer	Creators: Kelly Marcel, Craig Silverstein
2012	Face Off	Judge	Executive producers: Michael Agbabian, Dwight D. Smith
2013	Falling Skies	Creature and character designer	Creator: Robert Rodat
2017	Star Trek: Discovery	Lead creature designer	
2020	Star Trek: Picard	Lead creature designer	

== Awards and nominations ==
Year	Award	Organization	Work	Category	Result
2010	ADG Excellence in Production Design Award	Art Directors Guild	TRON: Legacy	Fantasy Film	Nominated

== See also ==
- Clover (creature)
- Face Off (season 3)
- Face Off (season 4)
- Glenn Hetrick
- List of Art Center College of Design people
- Ve Neill
- Patrick Tatopoulos
