= Merinthophobia =

Phobia of being restrained

Merinthophobia is the fear of being bound or tied up. The origin of the word merintho is Greek (meaning string). Merinthophobia is a specific phobia. The symptoms typically include anxiety, shortness of breath, rapid breathing, irregular heartbeat, sweating, nausea, dry mouth, fainting, inability to articulate words or sentences, or shaking. This fear may stem from an incident in which the person was bound either as a joke or intentionally, or observing someone who is bound, the trauma of such occurrence often stays with an individual for a lifetime. An individual with Merinthophobia will be very uncomfortable watching an illusionist escape from being bound. They may feel sick to their stomach. Treatments for this phobia include counseling, hypnotherapy, and psychotherapy.

== See also ==
List of phobias
