= Face Off season 1 =

Face Off
- Season 1
- No. of episodes: 8

Release
- Original network: Syfy
- Original release: January 26 – March 16, 2011

Season chronology
- Next → Season 2

The first season of the Syfy reality television series Face Off featured twelve prosthetic makeup artists competing in a series of challenges to create makeup effects. The winner received US$100,000 and a year's supply of makeup. The season premiered on January 26, 2011. Conor McCullagh of Orlando, Florida was the winner of Face Off season one.

== Judges ==
- Glenn Hetrick
- Ve Neill
- Patrick Tatopoulos
- McKenzie Westmore (Host)

== Contestants ==
Name	Age	Hometown	Place finished
Jessica Kramer	26	Scottdale, Pennsylvania	12th
Sergio Guerra	31	San Antonio, Texas	11th
Frank Ippolito	32	Cleveland, Ohio	10th
Marcel Banks	24	Tacoma, Washington	9th
Kayla "Jo" Holland	21	Hilo, Hawaii	8th
Anthony Pepe	35	Queens, New York City, New York	7th
Tom Devlin	29	East Stroudsburg, Pennsylvania	6th
Megan Areford	24	Pittsburgh, Pennsylvania	5th
Sam Cobb	32	Decatur, Georgia	4th
Tate Steinsiek	31	Brooklyn, New York City, New York	Runner-Up
Gage Hubbard	26	Willard, Utah	Runner-Up
Conor McCullagh	40	Orlando, Florida	Winner

== Contestant progress ==
Contestant		Episode							
Contestant		1	2	3	4	5	6	7	8
1	Conor	WIN	LOW	WIN	IN	HIGH	HIGH	IN	WINNER
2	Gage	LOW‡	IN	HIGH	HIGH	IN	IN	HIGH	RUNNER-UP
2	Tate	HIGH	LOW‡	IN	HIGH	HIGH‡	WIN	IN	RUNNER-UP
4	Sam	IN	IN	IN	IN	IN	IN	WIN	ELIMINATED
5	Megan	IN	IN	LOW	LOW*	WIN	LOW*	OUT	
6	Tom	HIGH	HIGH	LOW*	WIN	LOW*	OUT‡		
7	Anthony	IN	WIN	LOW	LOW	HIGH	OUT		
8	Jo	LOW	HIGH	HIGH	IN	OUT			
9	Marcel	IN	IN	HIGH	OUT				
10	Frank	HIGH	IN	OUT					
11	Sergio	LOW	OUT*						
12	Jessica	OUT*							

The contestant won Face Off.
The contestant was a runner-up.
The contestant was eliminated during the finale.
The contestant won a Spotlight Challenge.
The contestant was part of a team that won the Spotlight Challenge.
The contestant was in the top in the Spotlight Challenge.
The contestant was in the bottom in the Spotlight Challenge but was exempt from being eliminated.
The contestant was in the bottom in the Spotlight Challenge.
The contestant was a teammate of the eliminated contestant in the Spotlight Challenge.
The contestant was deemed the least successful in the Spotlight Challenge and was eliminated..
The contestant was deemed the second least successful in the Spotlight Challenge and was eliminated alongside another contestant.
‡ The contestant won the Foundation Challenge.
* The contestant was in the bottom in the Spotlight Challenge and was nominated by the winner

== Episodes ==
No. overall	No. in season	Title	Original release date	Viewers (millions)	Rating (18-49)
1	1	"Welcome to the Jungle"	January 26, 2011	1.440	0.7/2
Foundation Challenge: Create an original face makeup incorporating at least one item from the introductory reception room. The reward is the Immunity for the Spotlight Challenge.; Judge: Glenn Hetrick Top Foundations: Gage Tom Winner: Gage: Spotlight Challenge: In teams of two, create a human-animal hybrid based on either a black beetle, ostrich, or elephant. As the winner of the spotlight challenge, the winner of the spotlight challenge (as well as every subsequent spotlight challenge winner) was allowed to recommend who they believed should be eliminated.; Top Looks: Frank & Tate (Black Beetle) Conor & Tom (Elephant) Safe: Megan & Anthony (Ostrich) Sam & Marcel (Black Beetle) Bottom Looks: Jessica & Jo (Ostrich) Sergio & Gage (Elephant) Winner: Conor Recommended for Elimination: Jessica Eliminated: Jessica
2	2	"Naked Ambition"	February 2, 2011	1.041	0.5/1
Foundation Challenge: Being their own models, the contestants will have to design an original tattoo that has a special meaning for them.; Guest Judge: Thomas Pendelton Reward: First choice for Spotlight Challenge Top Foundations: Anthony Sam Tate Bottom Foundations: Frank Sergio Winner: Tate: Spotlight Challenge: Using one of the backdrops mentioned above, Body paint a nude model for a magazine cover photo shoot.; Guest Judge: Filippo Ioco Top Looks: Tom (Stairway) Jo (Ocean) Anthony (Petrified wood) Bottom Looks: Sergio (Tornado) Conor (New Orleans) Tate (Rainforest) Winner: Anthony Recommended for Elimination: Sergio Eliminated: Sergio
3	3	"Out of This World"	February 9, 2011	1.286	0.6/2
Spotlight Challenge: Create an alien inspired by the environmental conditions speculated to exist on extrasolar planet Gliese 581 g.; Guest Judge: Michael Westmore Top Looks: Conor & Jo (Royal Gliesan) Gage & Marcel (Dark Side albino creature) Bottom Looks: Anthony & Frank (Exo-skeletal creature) Tom & Megan (volcano dweller) Winner: Conor Recommended for Elimination: Tom Eliminated: Frank
4	4	"Bad to the Bone"	February 16, 2011	1.165	0.6/2
Spotlight Challenge: Design an original slasher movie villain, and a movie poster with title and tagline.; Guest Judge: Sean S. Cunningham Top Looks: Gage: Cautionary Point, an undead lighthouse keeper. Tagline: Heed The Warning Tate: Him, a genetic anomaly. Tagline: Your Mind...His Playground Tom: Teddy Told Me To, child-like killer with a yo-yo weapon. Tagline: It's All Fun And Games Till Someone Dies Bottom Looks: Marcel: Final Skate, a 70's era roller rink operator. Tagline: The Class Of '78 Is Going To Pieces Megan: Chester's Photography, a deranged photographer. Tagline: A Picture Says A Thousand Words...His Victims Say None Anthony: London Twilight, a mad doctor set in Victorian England. Tagline: The Doctor Is Out...Of His Mind Winner: Tom Recommended for Elimination: Megan Eliminated: Marcel
5	5	"Switched and Hitched"	February 23, 2011	1.320	0.6/2
Foundation Challenge: Create a realistic facial hair makeup that matches the model's costume.; Guest Judge: Steve la Porte Reward: First choice of models for the Spotlight Challenge Top Foundations Tate (Futuristic) Tom (Amish) Winner: Tate: Spotlight Challenge: Take an engaged couple and make them up so their genders are switched.; Top Looks: Conor & Megan (Formal wear - Willie & Cecily) Tate & Anthony (Las Vegas wear - Peter & Kathleen) Bottom Look: Tom & Jo (1970's - Dean & Mirai) Winner: Megan Recommended for Elimination: Tom Eliminated: Jo
6	6	"The Dancing Dead"	March 2, 2011	1.490	0.7/2
Foundation Challenge: Make a gallon of stage blood using grocery items, and apply it to a mock crime scene.; Guest Judge: Bob Jacks Reward: First choice of model for the Spotlight Challenge Top Foundations: Tate Tom Winner: Tom: Spotlight Challenge: Create a zombie character to work in a choreographed dance routine with the other contestants' creations, set to "Zombie" by Natalia Kills. Due to the double elimination, the winner of the spotlight challenge was allowed to recommend two people for elimination.; Guest Judge: Greg Nicotero Top Looks: Conor (Classic 80's style) Tate (Home invasion) Bottom Looks: Anthony (Prostitute) Tom (Roadkill) Megan (Plastic surgery client) Winner: Tate Recommended for Elimination: First Pick: Megan Second Pick: (None) Eliminated: Anthony, Tom
7	7	"Family Plot"	March 9, 2011	1.325	0.6/2
Spotlight Challenge: Being their own models, contestants are to create a make-up to make themselves unrecognizable to a loved one. Due to one artist's particularly poor performance in the challenge, the judges announced that they would not need to hear the winner's recommendation for elimination.; Reward: First choice of fairy tale and theme for the next Spotlight Challenge Top Looks: Gage (Matt (boyfriend) Monique) Sam (Brian (husband) Mark) Winner: Sam Eliminated: Megan
8	8	"Twisted Tales"	March 16, 2011	1.494	0.7/2
Spotlight Challenge: Assisted by two eliminated contestants, the remaining competitors were to re-imagine two fairy tale characters in a different genre.; Eliminated: Sam - assisted by Jo & Megan - reimagined a psychedelic version of The Little Mermaid Runners-up : Tate - assisted by Tom & Anthony - reimagined Little Red Riding Hood as a post-apocalyptic story Gage - assisted by Marcel & Jessica - reimagined Hansel and Gretel as an industrial story Winner: Conor - assisted by Frank & Sergio - reimagined The Frog Prince as a ghost story
