= Face Off season 3 =

Face Off
- Season 3
- No. of episodes: 12

Release
- Original network: Syfy
- Original release: August 21 – October 31, 2012

Season chronology
- ← Previous; Season 2 Next → Season 4

The third season of the Syfy reality television series Face Off premiered on August 21, 2012 and ended October 31, 2012. The season featured twelve prosthetic makeup artists competing against each other to create makeup effects. In the finale, they were voted on by the public in a live broadcast on Halloween. The grand prize for the third season was a position as a guest lecturer at the Make Up for Ever Academies in New York and Paris, a 2012 Toyota Prius v, and US$100,000.

The season was won by Nicole Chilelli of Stayton, Oregon, who holds four Face Off records for being the first female to win, the first contestant to be eliminated and then come back in the same season, the first returning contestant to win the season, and being the only champion chosen by the audience.

== Judges ==
- Glenn Hetrick
- Ve Neill
- Patrick Tatopoulos (three episodes)
- Neville Page
- McKenzie Westmore (host)

== Contestants ==
Name	Age	Hometown	Place finished
Joe Castro	41	Helotes, Texas	12th (disqualified)
Carpucine "C.C." Childs	30	Atlanta, Georgia	11th
Eric Garcia	31	Miami, Florida	10th
Jason Milani	25	Hopewell Junction, New York	9th
Tommy Pietch	27	Columbus, Ohio	8th
Rod Maxwell	46	West Hollywood, Los Angeles, California	7th
Alana Rose Schiro	20	Staten Island, New York City, New York	6th
Sarah Elizabeth Miller	29	Goshen, Indiana	5th
Roy Wooley	46	Tucker, Georgia	4th
Derek Garcia	31	Miami, Florida	Runner-up
Laura Dandridge	27	Orlando, Florida	Runner-up
Nicole Chilelli	28	Stayton, Oregon	Winner (Eliminated in Episode 4; Brought back in Episode 7)

== Production ==
Season 1 and 2 judge Patrick Tatopoulos stepped down from his position after the first episode in order to work on 300: Rise of an Empire, but later returned as a guest judge for the foundation challenge in episode 7 and in the final two episodes of the season. He is replaced by concept designer Neville Page, who has previously worked on Avatar as lead creature designer, Prometheus as character designer and Star Trek as lead creature and character designer. Ve Neill and Glenn Hetrick remain as judges, with McKenzie Westmore remaining as the show's host. A pair of fraternal twins will compete against each other this season.

Guests that appeared this season include Sean Astin, Brian Grazer, Kevin Smith, Gale Anne Hurd, Matthew Wood, Paul W. S. Anderson, Laila Ali and Barney Burman.

== Contestant progress ==
Contestant		Episode										
Contestant		1	2	3	4	5	6	7	8	9	10	11/12
1	Nicole	IN	IN	IN	OUT			IN‡	WIN	WIN	IN	WINNER
2	Laura	HIGH	HIGH	IN	HIGH	HIGH	IN	WIN	HIGH	IN	WIN	RUNNER-UP
2	Derek	LOW	IN	WIN	HIGH	LOW	WIN	LOW	LOW	HIGH	IN	RUNNER-UP
4	Roy	HIGH	HIGH	IN	WIN	HIGH	IN‡	HIGH	HIGH	IN	OUT	
5	Sarah	HIGH	WIN	LOW	IN	LOW	LOW	IN	LOW	OUT		
6	Alana	IN	IN	IN	IN	WIN	IN	LOW	OUT			
7	Rod	WIN	IN	IN	LOW	LOW	HIGH	OUT				
8	Tommy	LOW	IN	HIGH	LOW	HIGH	OUT					
9	Jason	IN	LOW	IN	IN‡	OUT						
10	Eric	IN‡	LOW	OUT								
11	C.C.	LOW	OUT									
12	Joe	DQ										

The contestant won Face Off.
The contestant was a runner-up.
The contestant won a Spotlight Challenge.
The contestant was part of a team that won the Spotlight Challenge.
The contestant was in the top in the Spotlight Challenge.
The contestant was in the bottom in the Spotlight Challenge.
The contestant was a teammate of the eliminated contestant in the Spotlight Challenge.
The contestant was eliminated.
The contestant was disqualified from the competition.
The contestant returned to the competition.
‡ The contestant won the Foundation Challenge.

== Episodes ==
No. overall	No. in season	Title	Original release date	U.S. viewers (millions)	18-49 Rating
19	1	"A Force to Be Reckoned With"	August 21, 2012	1.837	0.8
Foundation Challenge: Using at least one item from the roof-top pool party, artists must create an original face make-up to display their personality and originality.; Guest Judge: Sean Astin Reward: Immunity Top Foundations: Derek Eric Winner: Eric: Spotlight Challenge: Working in teams of two, artists must create an original alien character that would fit in the Mos Eisley Cantina scene from Star Wars.; Guest Judge: Matthew Wood Reward: The winning character will be featured on the Star Wars website in its original form and stylized for The Clone Wars animated series. Top Looks: Laura & Sarah - (Bounty hunter from Dagobah) Roy & Rod - (Robotic Exoskeleton) Safe: Alana & Nicole - (Waitress) Eric & Jason - (Mercenary / Assassin) Bottom Looks: Derek & C.C. - (Jazz saxophone player) Joe & Tommy - (Female bodyguard) Winner: Rod Disqualified: Joe^{a}
20	2	"Pirate Treasure"	August 28, 2012	1.583	0.7
Spotlight Challenge: After picking a key from a chest left in the contestant house, artists travelled to San Diego where they met McKenzie at the HMS Surprise. On the ship were 11 treasure chests that their keys could open up, revealing an inspiration the artist had to use in their creation of an original pirate character "who has become one with the sea".; Reward: US$5000 Top Looks: Roy - (Dagger) Sarah - (Sea urchins) Laura - (Shells) Safe: Nicole - (Ship in a bottle) Rod - (Seahorses) Derek - (Netting) Alana - (Crabs) Tommy - (Kelp) Bottom Looks: Eric - (Spyglass) C.C. - (Barnacles) Jason - (Jewels) Winner: Sarah Eliminated: C.C.
21	3	"Year of the Dragon"	September 4, 2012	1.759	0.8
Spotlight Challenge: After visiting the Thien Hau Temple, the artists working in teams of two must create a Chinese New Year Dragon makeup that can withstand the elaborate movements of an acrobatic dance routine. The team members' must also incorporate their own Chinese zodiac symbols in the Dragon makeup.; Top Looks: Derek & Tommy - (Monkey & Ox) Safe: Rod & Nicole - (Snake & Rat) Jason & Roy - (Rabbit & Snake) Laura & Alana - (Rat & Goat) Bottom Looks: Eric & Sarah - (Monkey & Pig) Winner: Derek Eliminated: Eric
22	4	"Alice in Zombieland"	September 11, 2012	1.410	0.7
Foundation Challenge: Create a realistic trauma make-up to make it appear that the model withstood a 10-round boxing match.; Guest Judge: Laila Ali Reward: Immunity Top Foundations: Jason Nicole Winner: Jason: Spotlight Challenge: After visiting the Descanso Gardens, contestants will need to create an original take on a character from Alice's Adventures in Wonderland who has been infected with the zombie virus from Resident Evil.; Guest Judge: Paul W. S. Anderson Reward: Top Looks: Laura - (The Hatter) Roy - (Queen of Hearts) Derek - (Cheshire Cat) Safe: Sarah - (Cheshire Cat) Jason - (The Hatter) Alana - (The White Rabbit) Bottom Looks: Tommy - (The White Rabbit) Nicole - (Alice) Rod - (Queen of Hearts) Winner: Roy Eliminated: Nicole
23	5	"Supermobile"	September 18, 2012	1.799	0.9
Spotlight Challenge: After visiting the Bronson Caves and meeting with season 2 winner Rayce, teams of two must create an original superhero and sidekick characters that ties in with a specific vehicle^{b}.; Guest Judge: Kevin Smith Top Looks: Laura & Tommy - (Humber Pig) Alana & Roy - (Dodge Charger) Bottom Looks: Jason & Rod - (Tatra T87) Derek & Sarah - (AJS Motorcycle and Sidecar) Winner: Alana Eliminated: Jason
24	6	"Dishonorable Proportions"	September 25, 2012	1.491	0.7
Foundation Challenge: Create an avant-garde beauty makeup that complements the dress the model is wearing.; Guest Judge: Lijha Stewart Reward: Immunity Top Foundations: Derek Roy Winner: Roy: Spotlight Challenge: After visiting the steampunk-themed nightclub The Edison, where they view the City Watch, Aristocrate, Thug, and Weeper characters from the video game Dishonored, the contestants are to create an original take on their selected character. Their final designs not only need to fit in that world, but must also have exaggerated proportions.; Top Looks: Derek - (Thug) Rod - (Aristocrat) Safe: Alana - (Weeper) Roy - (City Watch) Laura - (Weeper) Bottom Looks: Sarah - (Aristocrat) Tommy - (Thug) Winner: Derek Eliminated: Tommy
25	7	"Monster Twist"	October 2, 2012	1.668	0.8
Foundation Challenge: At Olvera Street, the eliminated contestants (excluding Joe) were to create a Day of the Dead face makeup.; Guest Judge: Patrick Tatopoulos Reward: Returning to the show as a contestant Top Foundations Eric Nicole Winner: Nicole: Spotlight Challenge: Working with children from the non-profit group City Hearts, Kids Say Yes to the Arts, contestants are to create an original movie monster using a child's sketch as inspiration; Reward: Art supplies will be donated to City Hearts, Kids Say Yes to the Arts in the winner's honor Top Looks: Roy - (Tickle monster, blinking eyes) Laura - (Vampire-dragon baby) Safe: Nicole - (Cave-dwelling demon) Sarah - (Sweetie Stealer) Bottom Looks: Derek - (People-eating alien) Alana - (Big eye, many nostrils) Rod - (Big-headed alien that blinks when it sleeps) Winner: Laura Eliminated: Rod
26	8	"Who's the New Who?"	October 9, 2012	1.799	0.8
Spotlight Challenge: Create a hybrid human creature that captures the essence of Dr. Seuss by using characters from Dr. Seuss's Sleep Book as inspiration.^{c}; Guest Judge: Brian Grazer Top Looks: Nicole - (Bumble Tub) Laura - (Chippendale Mupp) Roy - (Foona Lagoona Baboona) Bottom Looks: Alana - (Offt) Derek - (Snorter McPhail) Sarah - (Hinkle Horn Honker) Winner: Nicole Eliminated: Alana
27	9	"Junkyard Cyborg"	October 16, 2012	1.792	0.9
Spotlight Challenge: After being given a half-hour to source parts from a junkyard, the contestants must incorporate the pieces they scavenged into an original cyborg makeup.; Guest Judge: Gale Ann Hurd Top Looks: Nicole - (Princess from another planet) Derek - (Future soldier with injuries) Safe: Laura - (Intercity post-apocalyptic soldier) Roy - (Zombie) Bottom Looks: Sarah - (Military experiment) Winner: Nicole Eliminated: Sarah
28	10	"Scene of the Crime"	October 23, 2012	1.715	0.8
Spotlight Challenge: Choosing one of four mock crime scenes in the woods, the artists will need to create an original wesen character (based on the TV show Grimm) that would have most likely committed the crime.; Guests: Silas Weir Mitchell and Barney Burman Guest Judge: Richard Hatem Top Looks: Laura - Botanist attacked by an insectoid Wesen Safe: Derek - Cyclist attacked by a raptor-like creature Nicole - Mother and Baby on a picnic attacked by a werewolf Bottom Looks: Roy - Camper attacked by a Königschlange Winner: Laura Eliminated: Roy
29	11	"Immortal Enemies"	October 30, 2012	2.096	1.2
Spotlight Challenge: Create two Halloween-themed characters, an evil demon and a good witch, that will perform in a choreographed stunt show.^{d}; Guest: Michael Westmore Guest Judge: Patrick Tatopoulos Derek - assisted by Eric & Jason chose the Fire theme Laura - assisted by Rod & Tommy chose the Earth theme Nicole - assisted by Roy & Sarah chose the Water theme
30	12	"Live Finale"	October 31, 2012	1.613	0.8
A live reunion of the contestants with a review of the current season and preview of the next before the winner of Face Off as voted by the fans is announced. Judge Ve Neil made an appearance via satellite in a pre-recorded message to the final three by wishing them good luck as she is busy working on The Hunger Games: Catching Fire. After winning the season, Nicole is the first Face Off winner to have been eliminated, come back, and win. Winner: Nicole

== Footnotes ==
1. Following the judging on the Face Off Reveal Stage, Joe left the set entirely before the Spotlight Challenge's final results were announced. As a result, he was disqualified from the competition with the elimination of the remaining bottom three not needed. Since then, Joe made no return appearances in the season, including for the Foundation Challenge to bring somebody back to the competition.
2. Not chosen: Lamborghini Gallardo or Space Mole
3. Not chosen: Biffer-Baum Bird or Hoop-Soup-Snoop
4. First of a two-part finale. The winner was chosen in the second half.
