= Tate Steinsiek =

American make-up artist

Bryan "Tate" Steinsiek
- Born: 17 March 1978 (age 48); Hitchita, Oklahoma, U.S.
- Occupations: Make-up artist, musician
- Years active: 2004–present
- Known for: Appeared on Seasons 1 & 5 of SyFy television series Face Off

Bryan "Tate" Steinsiek is an American SFX and prosthetic makeup artist. He is best known for his appearances on Seasons One and Five of the SyFy reality series Face Off. Steinsiek has worked on special effects and makeup for several films and television series, including Law & Order, Clash of the Gods, and The Amazing Spider-Man.

== Early life ==
Steinsiek was born in Hitchita, Oklahoma to Butch Steinsiek, a boxer, and his wife Tommy Ann, an artist. Steinsiek told the Tulsa World that his mother had been contacted by his preschool teacher after he drew "a horrific monster with big fangs, vomiting blood." The teacher advised her not to allow Steinsiek to watch horror movies, to which she replied "he isn't allowed to anyway." He attended Morris High School in Morris, where he graduated in 1996. Steinsiek helped found the Tulsa-based groove metal band Pheed in January 1998, in which he played bass. After changing the band's name to Malevolence, the group garnered some local acclaim and, after opening for national acts Ice-T, Suicidal Tendencies, and Infectious Grooves the band relocated to Boston at the recommendation of their label. Steinsiek is a citizen of the Muscogee Nation, a Native American tribe based in Oklahoma.

== Career ==
Shortly after relocating to Boston, Steinsiek left Malevolence to relocate again, this time to Pittsburgh, in order to work under the "Master of Splatters," Tom Savini. Savini then offered him the opportunity to work on the horror film Zombie Honeymoon, which was filming in New York City. Steinsiek relocated to Brooklyn in 2002, where he started his own SFX makeup company, Ill Willed Productions. By 2003, Steinsiek had provided special effects prosthetic makeup and prop fabrication work for clients including The Jim Henson Company, DreamWorks, NBC, HBO, and Xbox. While in New York, Steinsiek met his wife Holly, who is also a makeup artist; the pair worked together on the History Channel production Clash of the Gods, in which they each had an acting cameo as well. In 2006, he was featured on the reality series Making It Big, where he won the FX Challenge. As of September 2013, Steinsiek is in pre-production of his directorial debut, which is an adaptation of the Clive Barker short story Son of Celluloid.

In 2017, Steinsiek worked with seasonal retailer Spirit Halloween to design and sculpt several animatronics and props including Forest Demon, Menacing Molly, and a Hanging Slimer from the Ghostbusters franchise; later that year, the animatronics were finalized and mass-produced by manufacturer Crazy Create while the Slimer was produced by the manufacturer Party Time Latex Arts and Crafts Factory. In 2017, Steinsiek began working with Fangoria, doing special effects for 2018's Puppet Master: The Littlest Reich and 2019's film Satanic Panic. In 2019, he filmed his directorial debut, a reboot of Castle Freak. In 2019, he was also nominated (along with Preston Fassel) for a Rondo Hatton Classic Horror Award for Best Article.

=== Face Off ===
in 2011, Steinsiek was selected to compete in the first season of the SyFy reality series Face Off. Out of the original field of twelve contestants, Steinsiek made it to the final episode as one of the top three artists, eventually losing a tight race to winner Conor McCullagh. He was invited back to participate in the fifth season of the series, in which he and seven other series "veterans" were pitted against eight new contestants. In the season 5 episode "Living Art," Steinsiek dropped a clay mold onto his hand, crushing his fingers, resulting in his being taken to an emergency care clinic and receiving thirteen stitches. His fellow contestants helped clean out his mold and apply the first layer of latex during his three-hour absence; however, the final result still put Steinsiek in the bottom of the Spotlight Challenge for the first time of the season. Steinsiek was again runner-up to eventual season winner Laura Tyler.
