= Rider–Waite Tarot =

Tarot deck

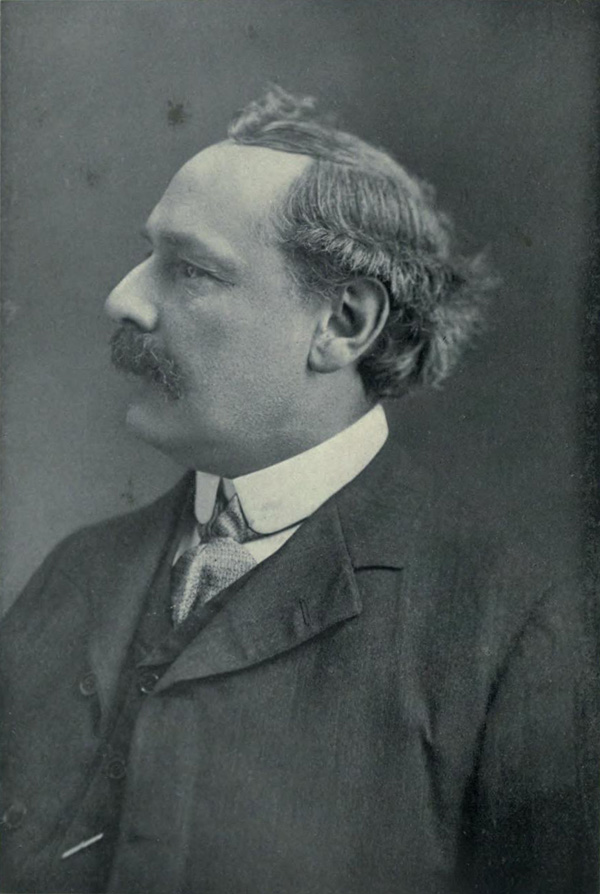
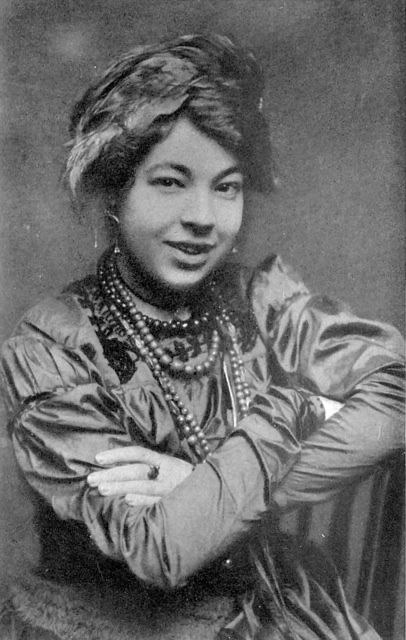
A. E. Waite and Pamela Colman Smith

The Rider–Waite Tarot is a popular deck for tarot card reading, first published by William Rider & Son in 1909, based on the instructions of academic and mystic A. E. Waite and illustrated by Pamela Colman Smith, both members of the Hermetic Order of the Golden Dawn. Also known as the Waite–Smith, Rider–Waite–Smith (RWS), or Rider Tarot, the deck has been published in numerous editions and inspired a wide array of variants and imitations. Estimates suggest over 100 million copies of the deck circulate across over 20 countries.

== Overview ==
The Rider–Waite tarot deck has 78 cards: 56 Minor Arcana, and 22 Major Arcana. The Minor Arcana generally correspond to the suits of Spanish or Italian playing cards. The Major Arcana, corresponding to the trump cards of gaming tarot, have unique designs numbered from 0 (The Fool) to 21 (The World).

While the images are simple, the details and backgrounds feature abundant symbolism. Some imagery remains similar to that found in earlier decks, but overall the Waite–Smith card designs are substantially different from their predecessors. Christian imagery was removed from some cards, and added to others. For example, The Papess became The High Priestess, and no longer features a Papal tiara. The Lovers, previously depicting a medieval scene of a clothed man and woman receiving a blessing from a noble or cleric, was changed to a depiction of the naked Adam and Eve in the Garden of Eden, and the ace of cups featuring a dove carrying Sacramental bread. The Minor Arcana are illustrated with allegorical scenes by Smith, where earlier decks, with a few rare exceptions, had simple designs for the Minor Arcana.

The symbols and imagery used in the deck were influenced by the 19th-century magician and occultist Eliphas Levi, as well as by the teachings of the Hermetic Order of the Golden Dawn. In order to accommodate the astrological correspondences taught by the Golden Dawn, Waite introduced several innovations to the deck. He switched the order of the Strength and Justice cards so that Strength corresponded with Leo and Justice corresponded with Libra. The medieval Sola Busca tarot also has Strength on the same position. He based The Lovers on Italian tarot decks, which have two persons and an angel, to reinforce its correspondence with Gemini.

== Major Arcana ==
The Major Arcana of the Rider–Waite tarot are illustrated below.

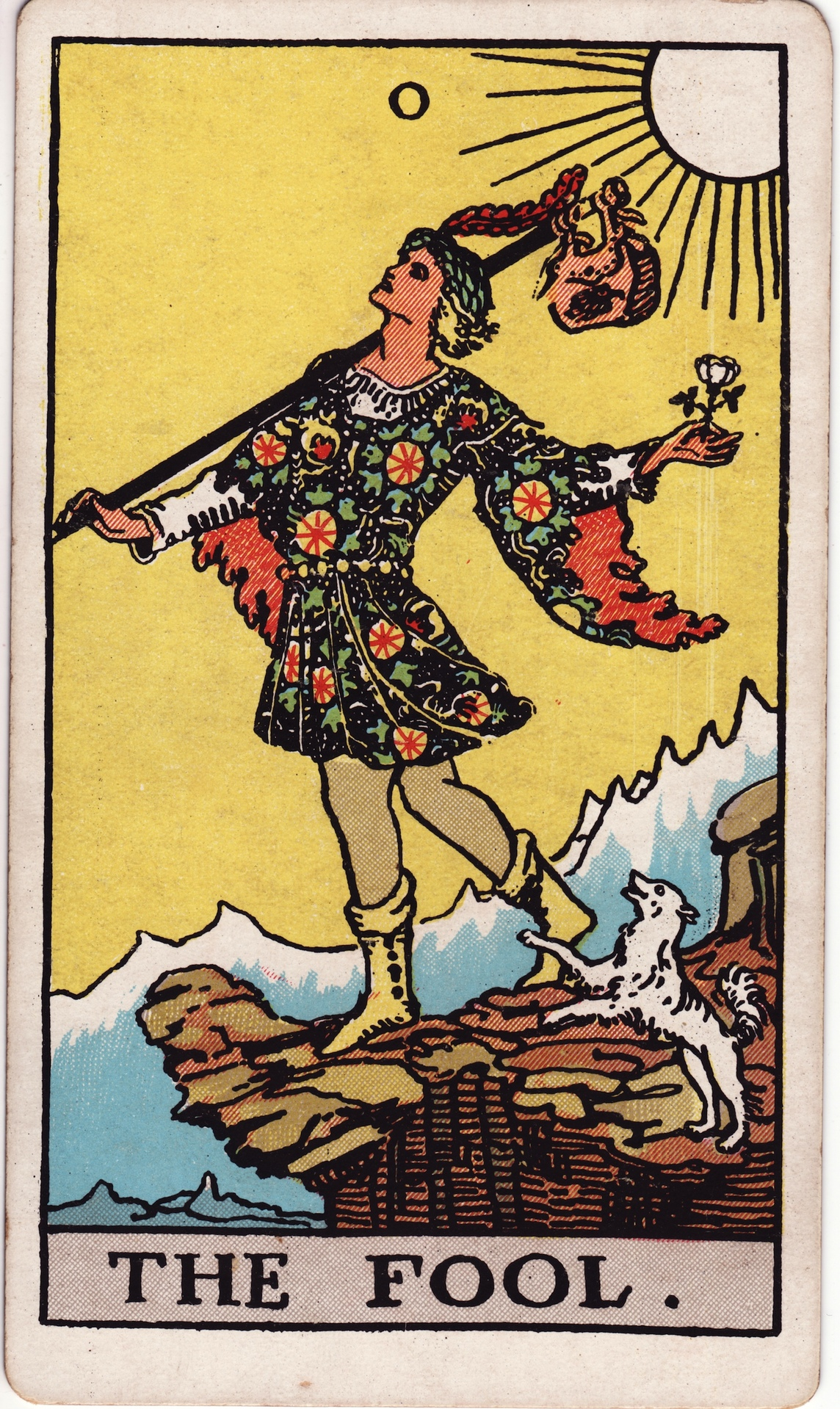
0 – The Fool

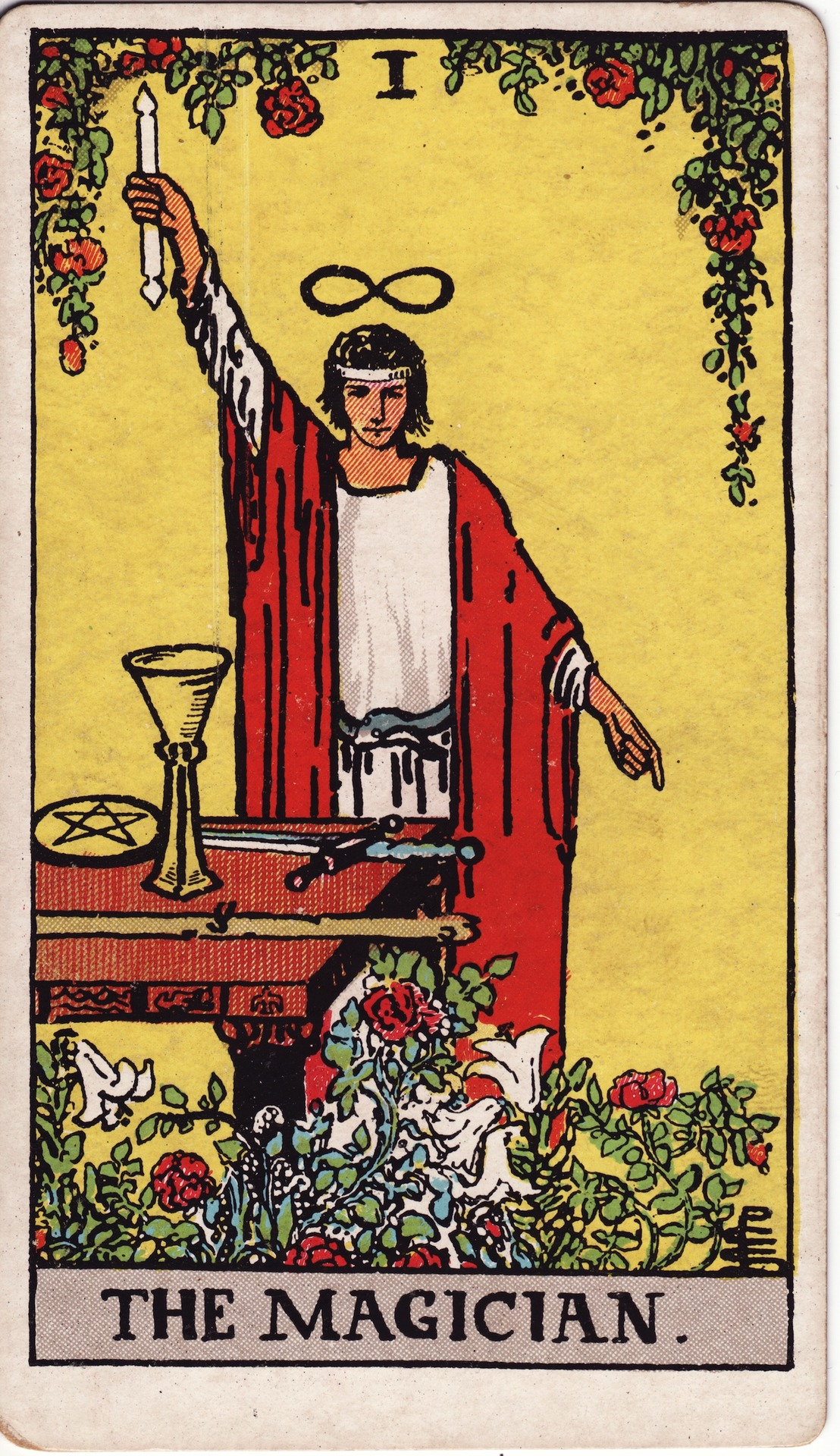
I – The Magician

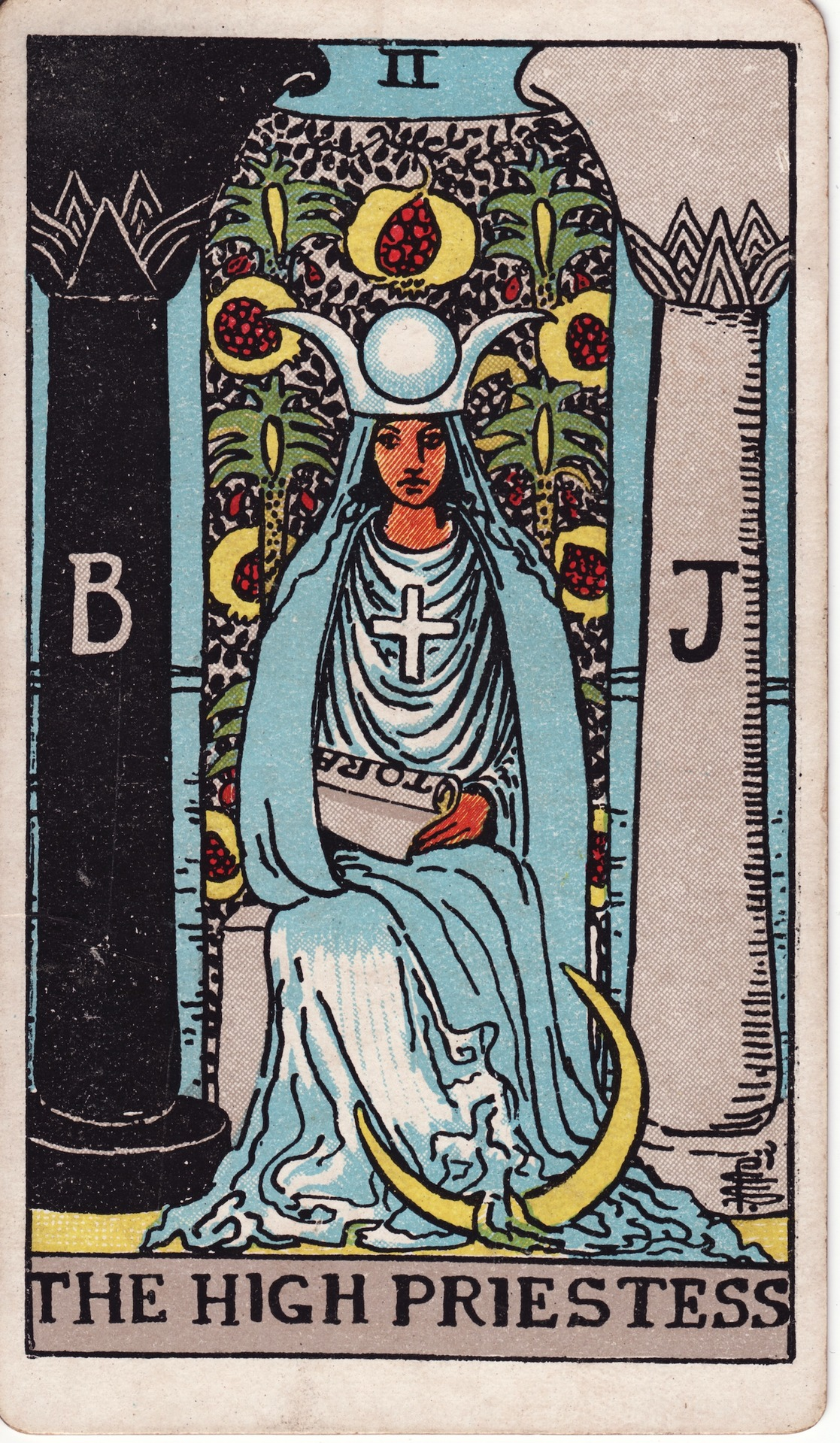
II – The High Priestess

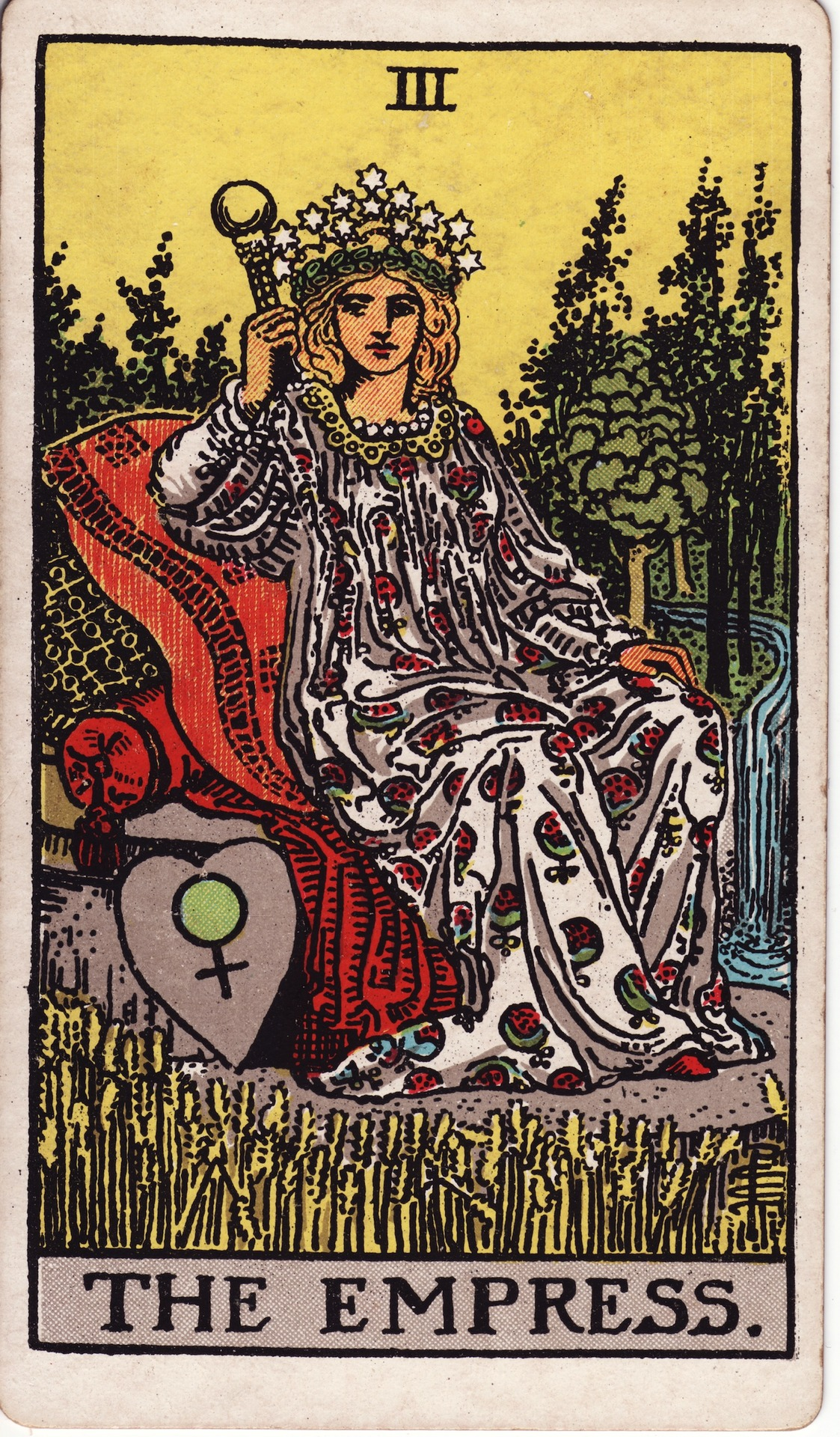
III – The Empress

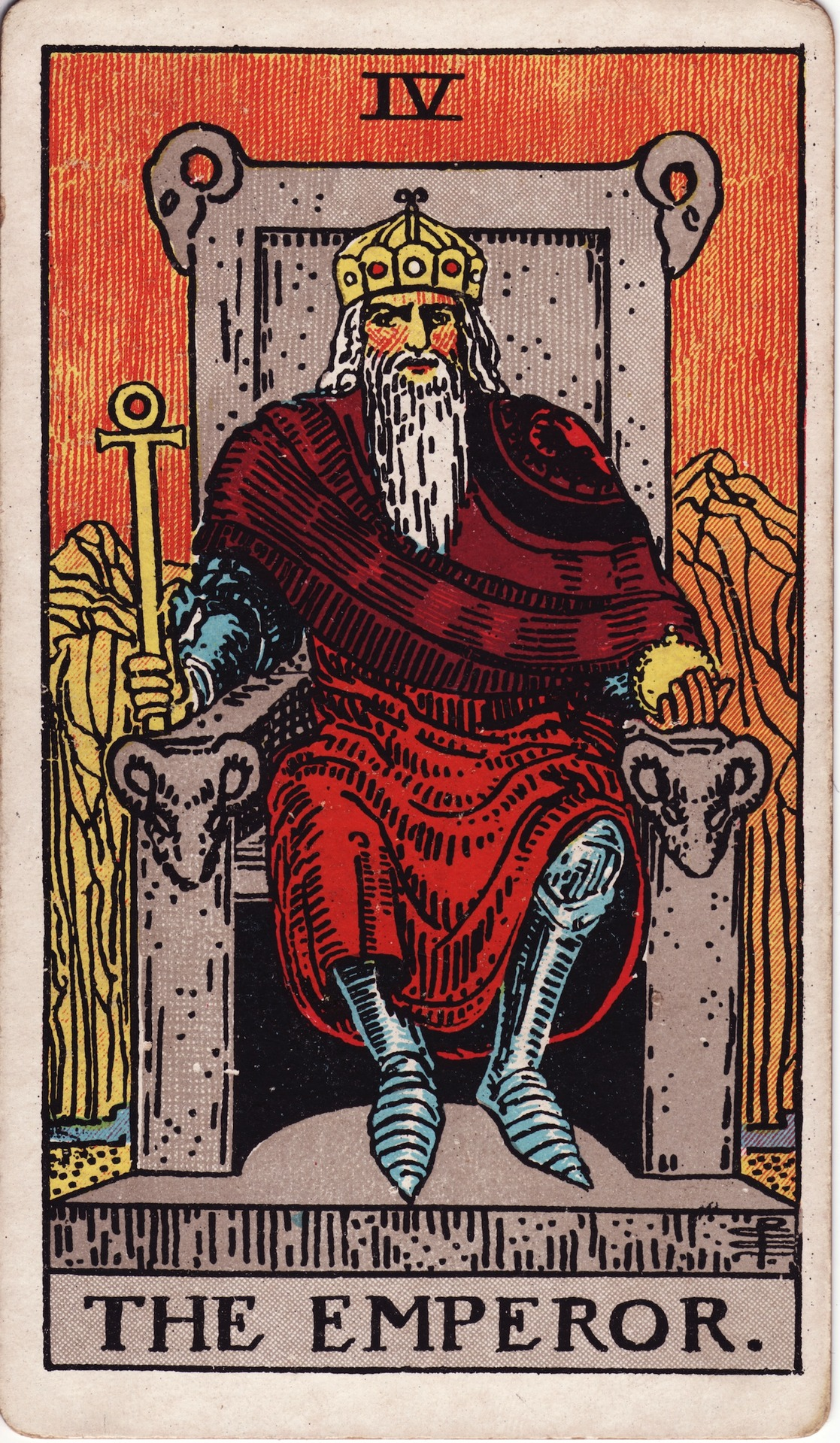
IV – The Emperor

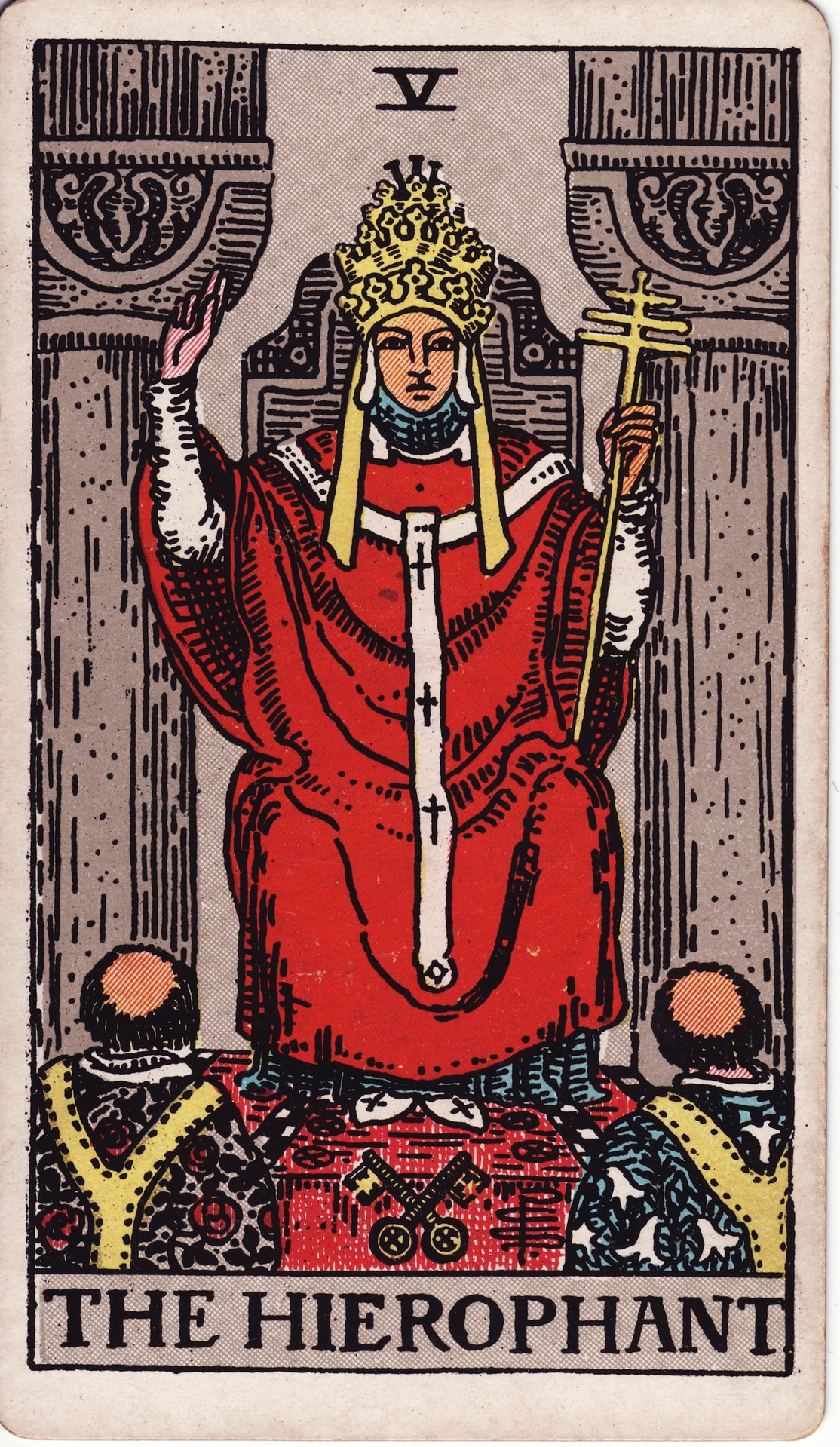
V – The Hierophant

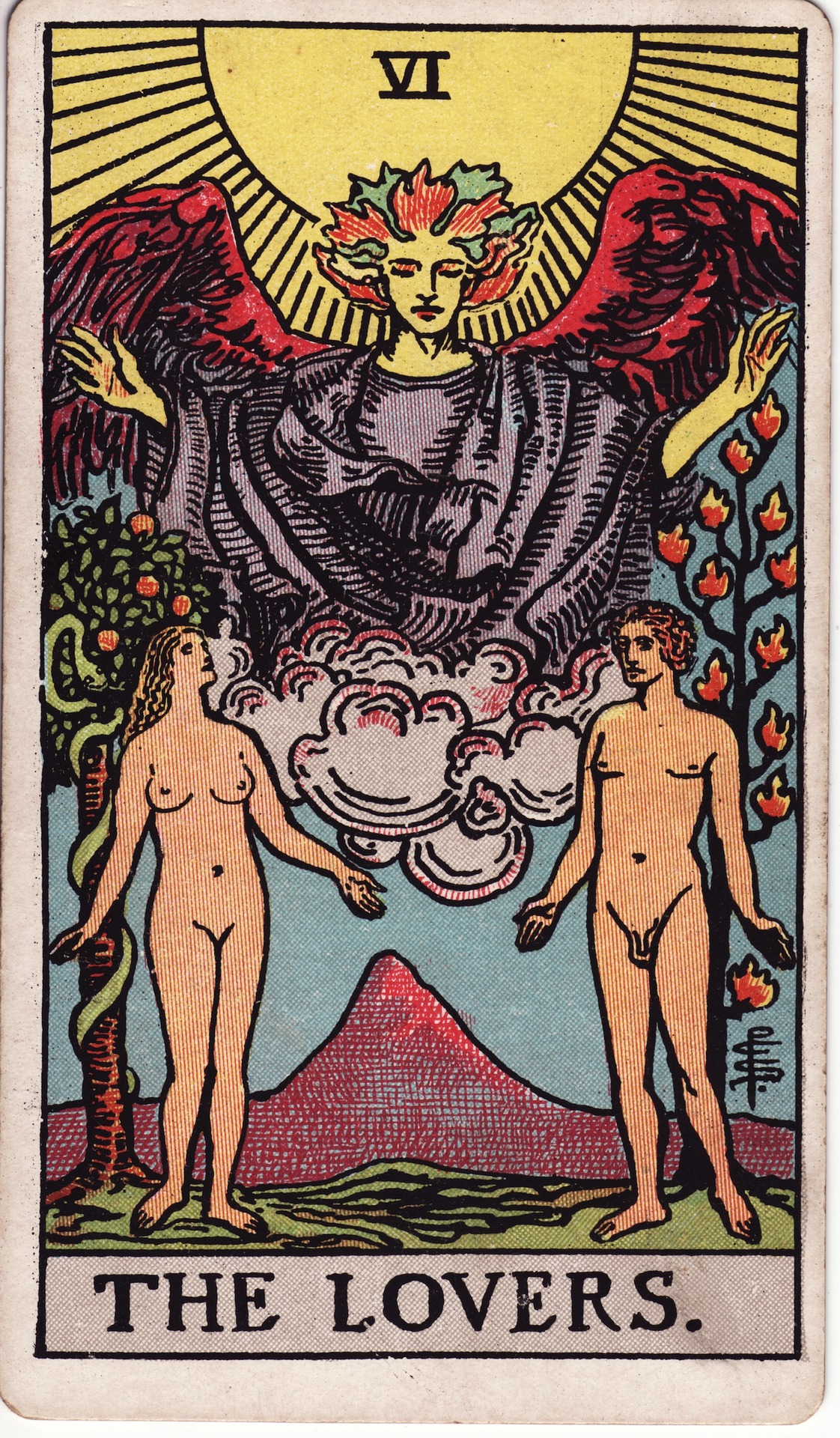
VI – The Lovers

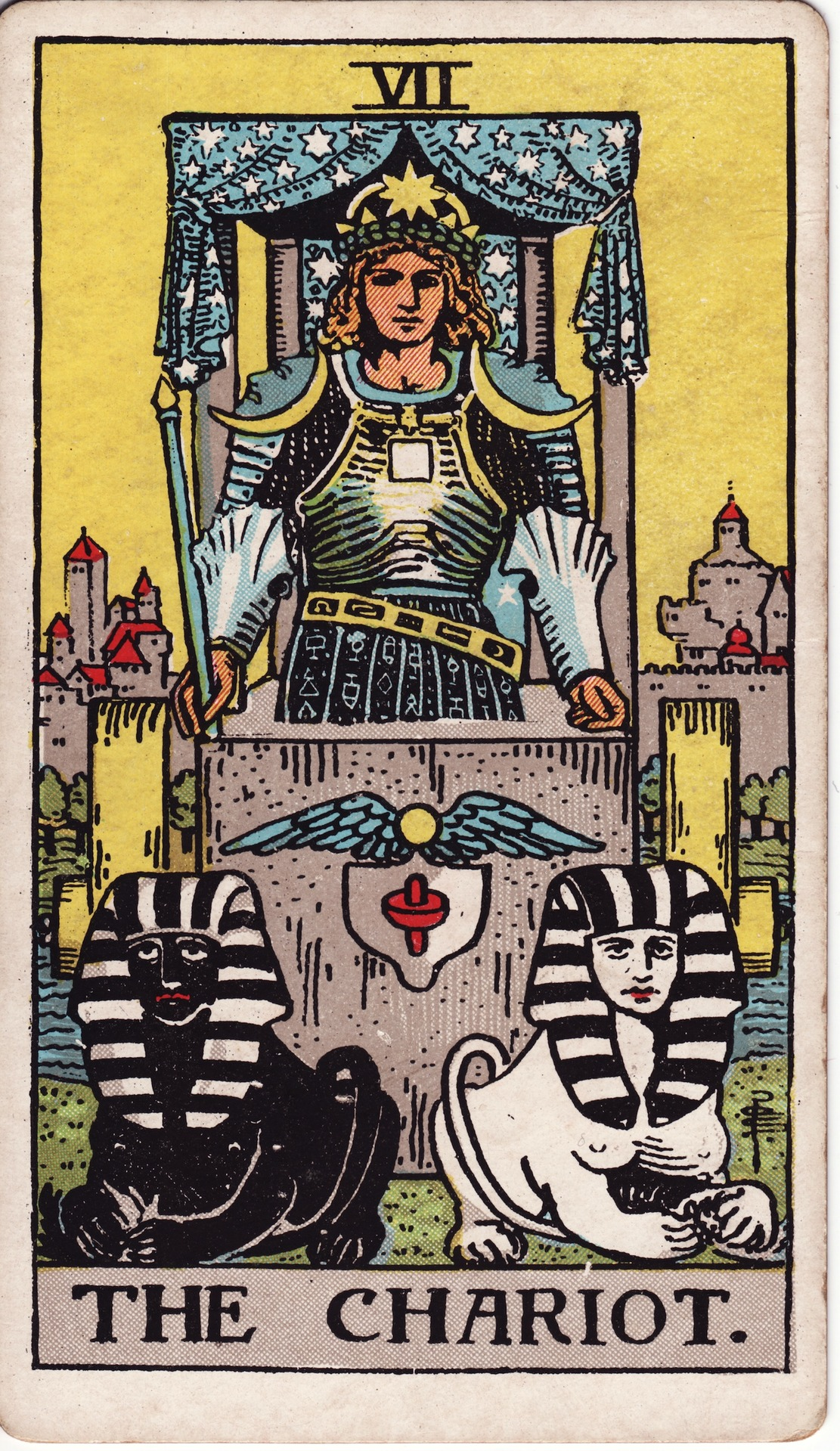
VII – The Chariot

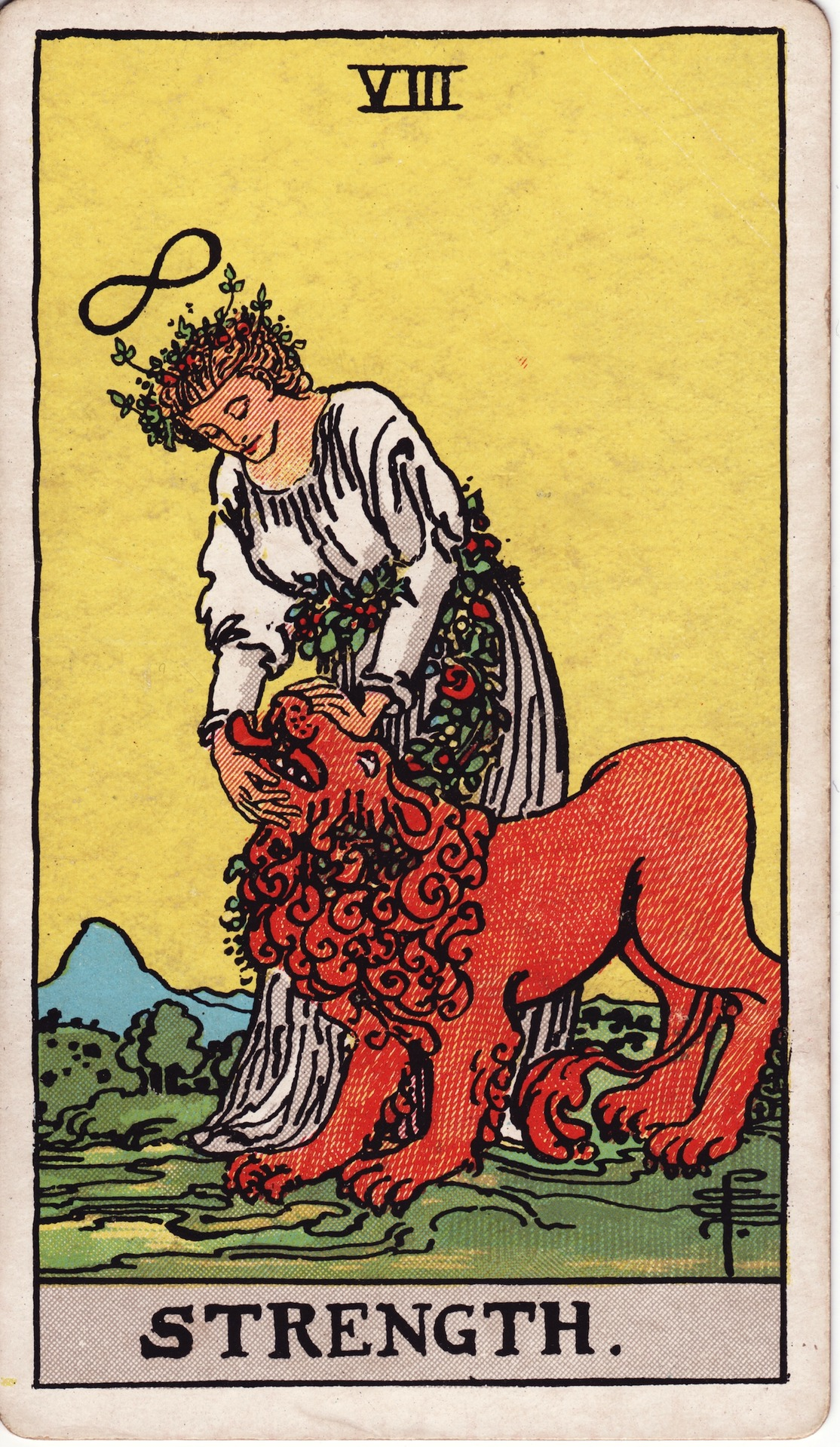
VIII – Strength

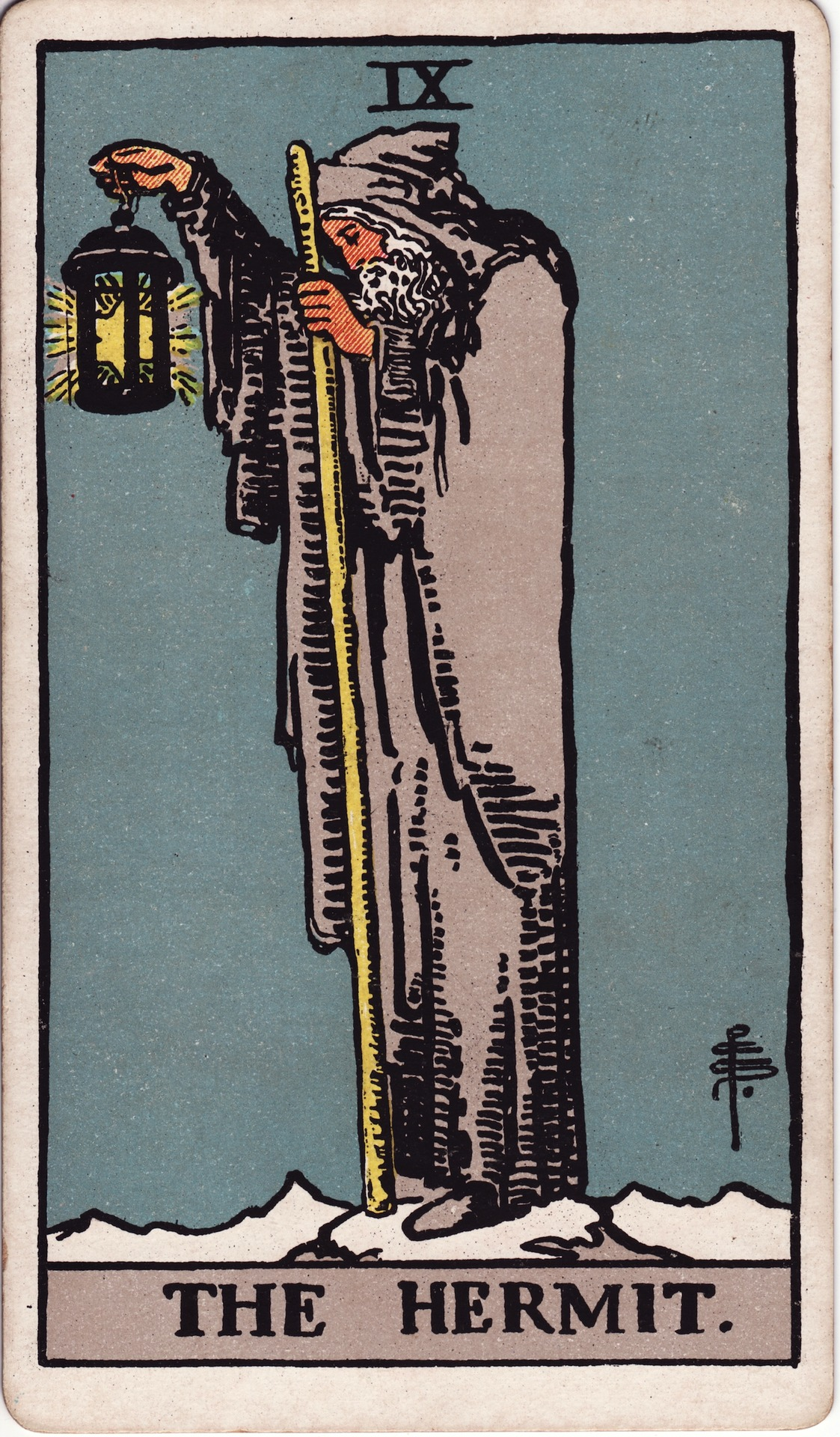
IX – The Hermit

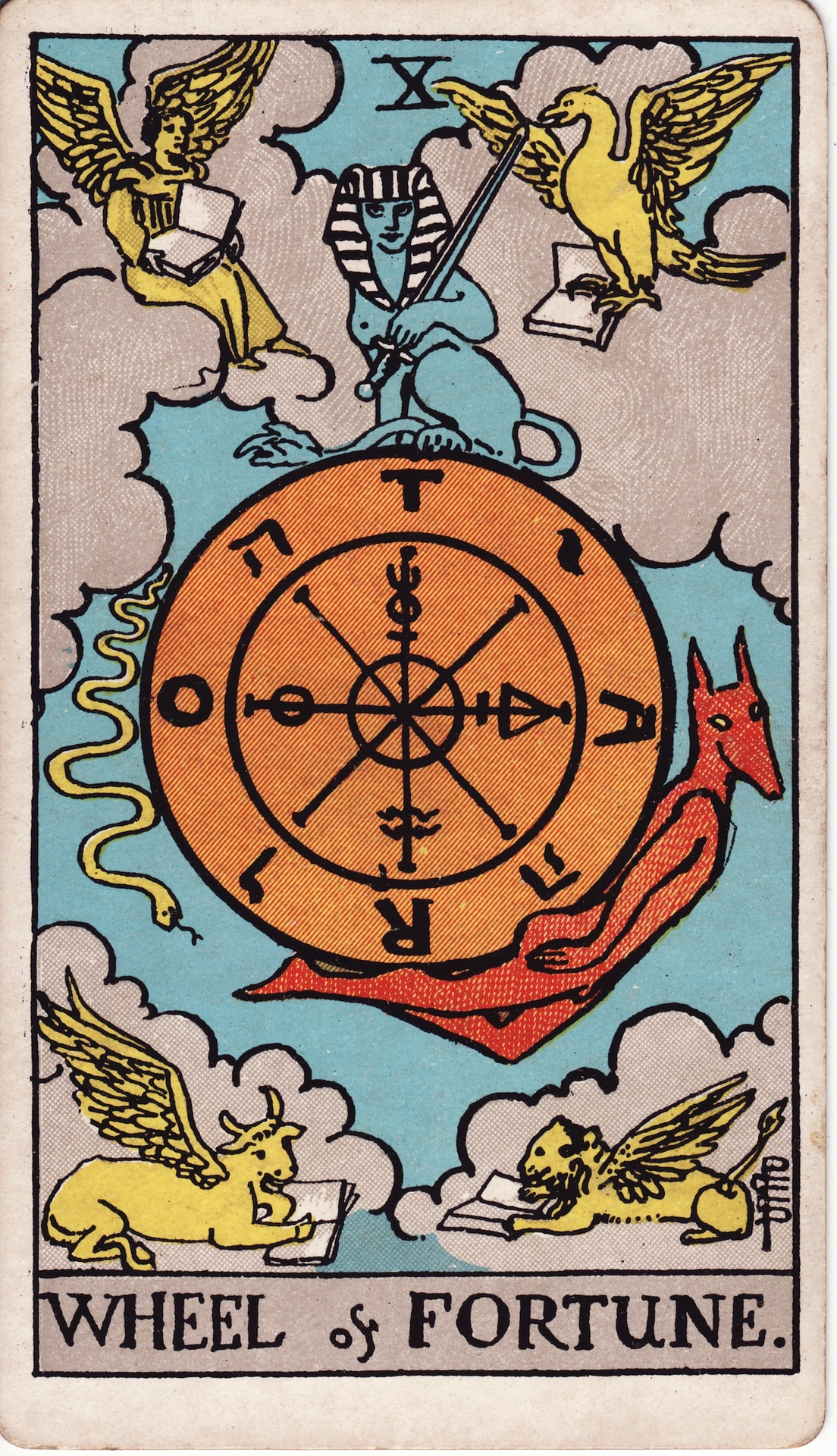
X – Wheel of Fortune

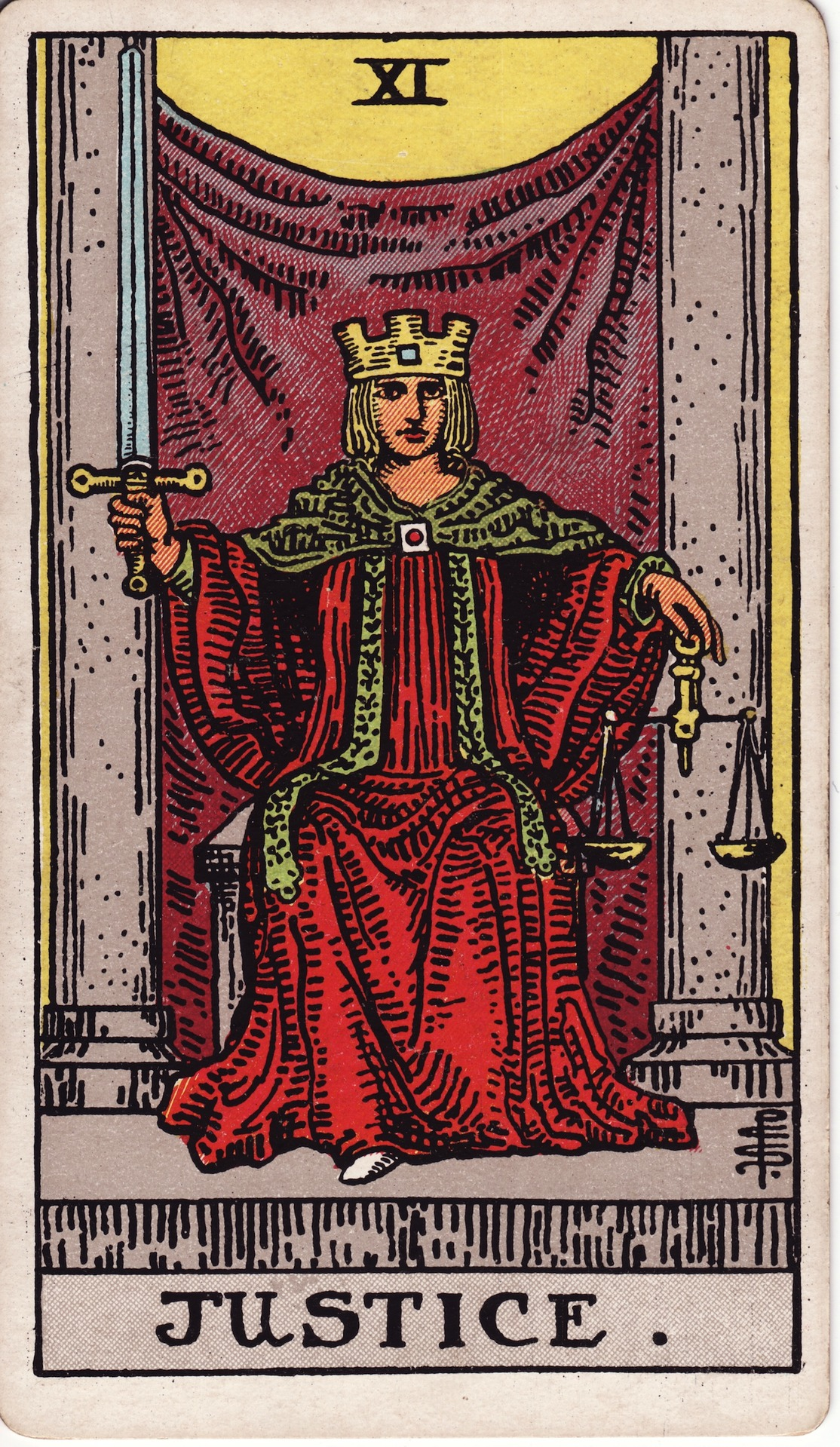
XI – Justice

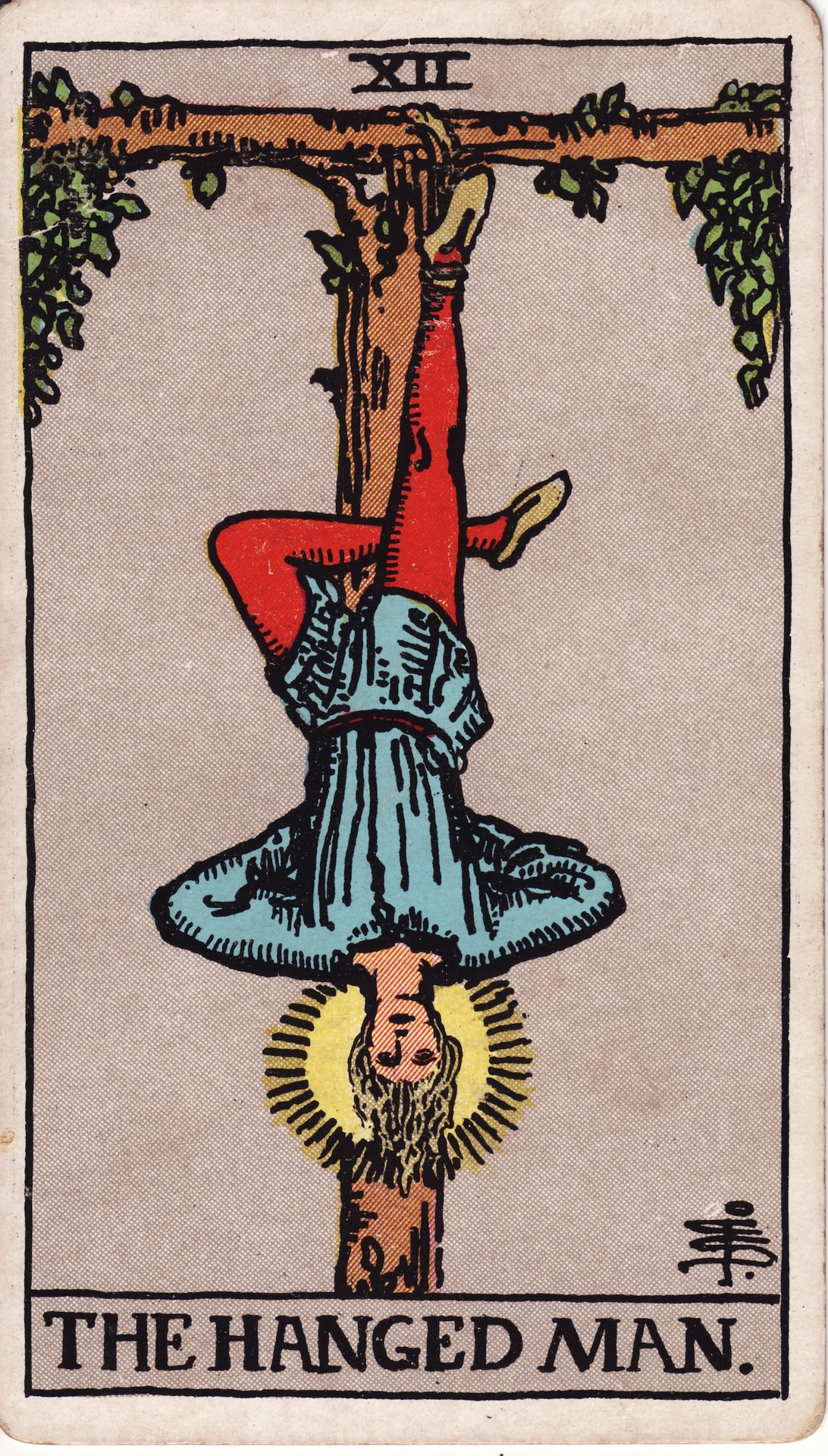
XII – The Hanged Man

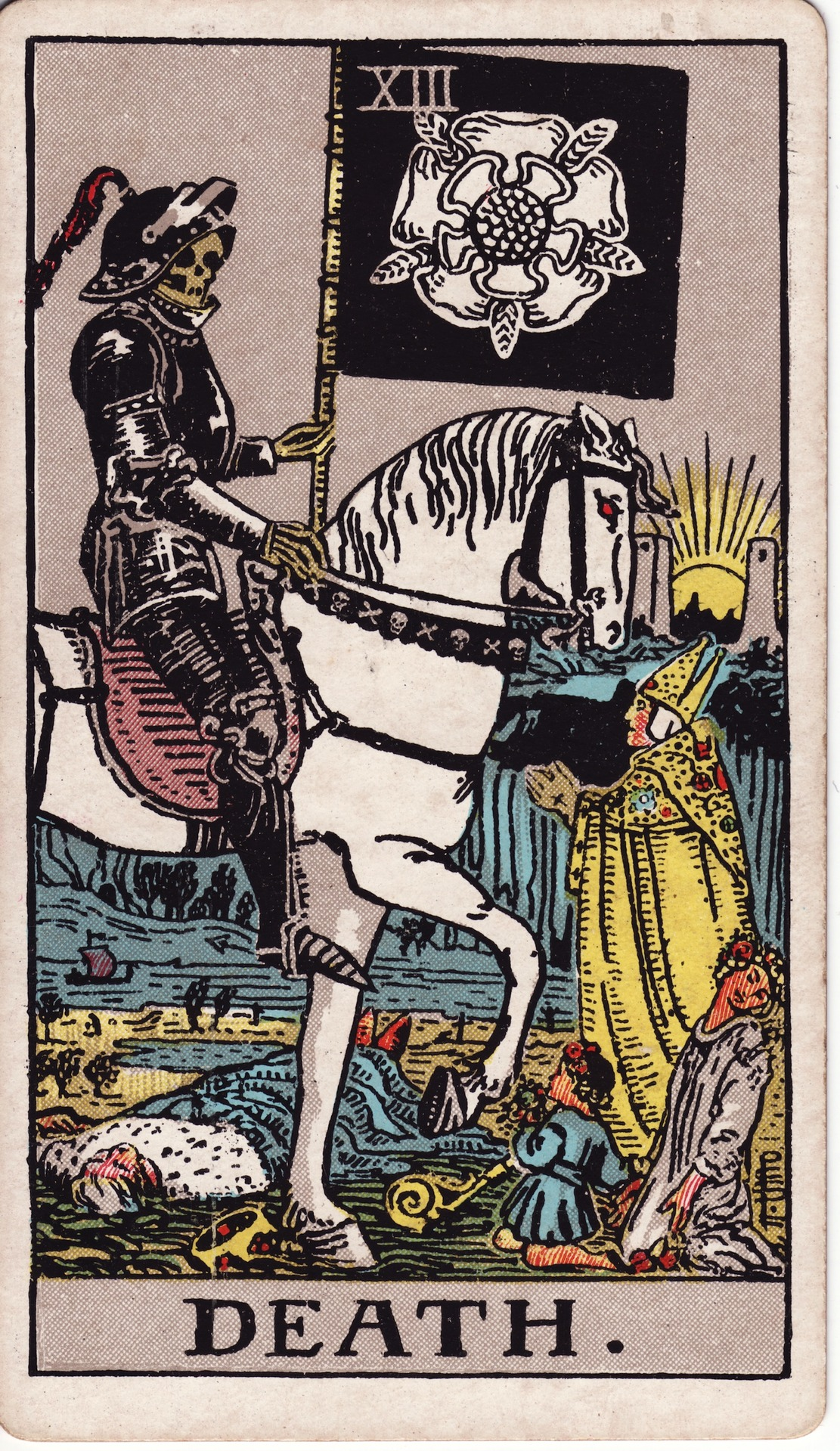
XIII – Death

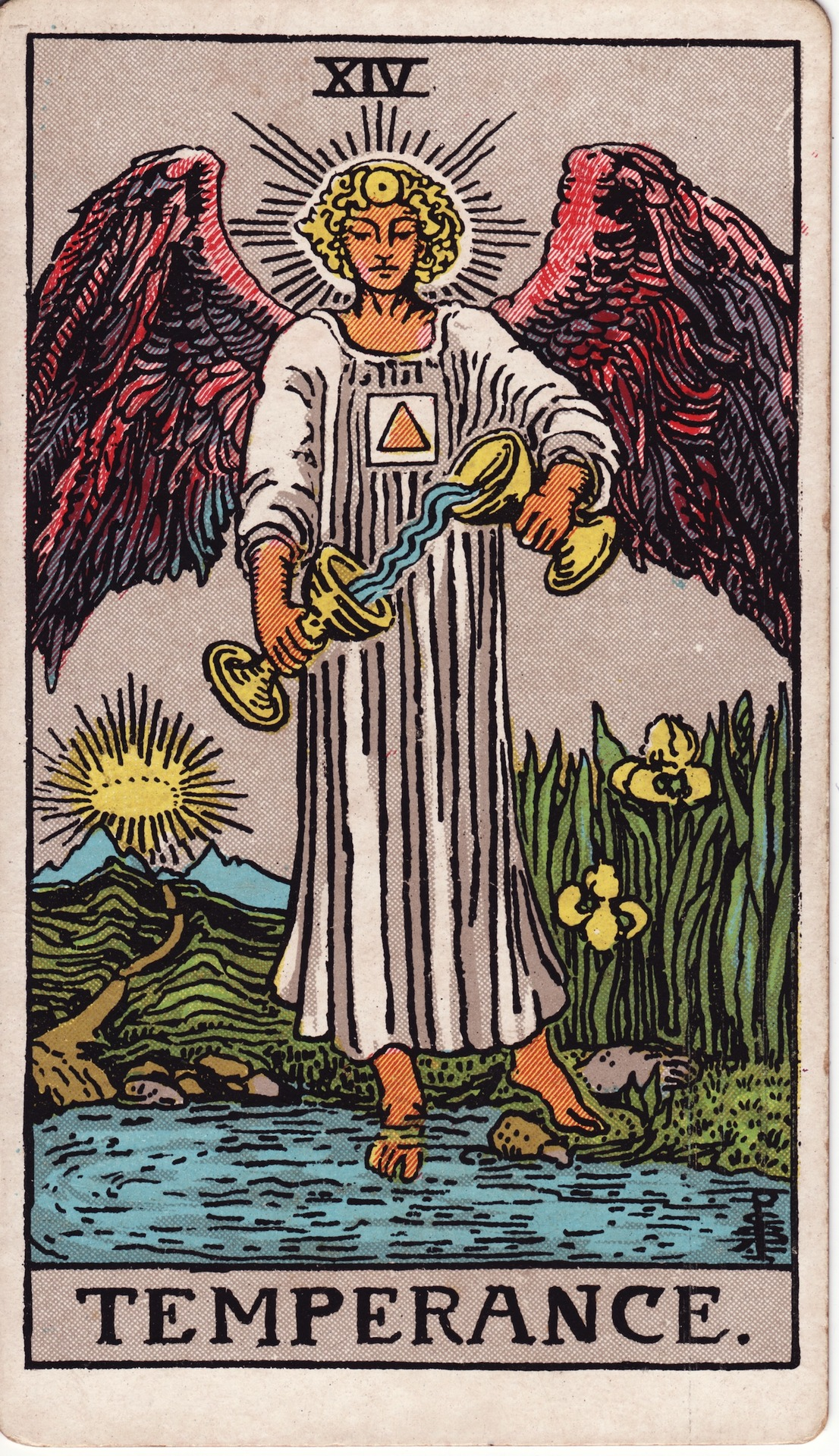
XIV – Temperance

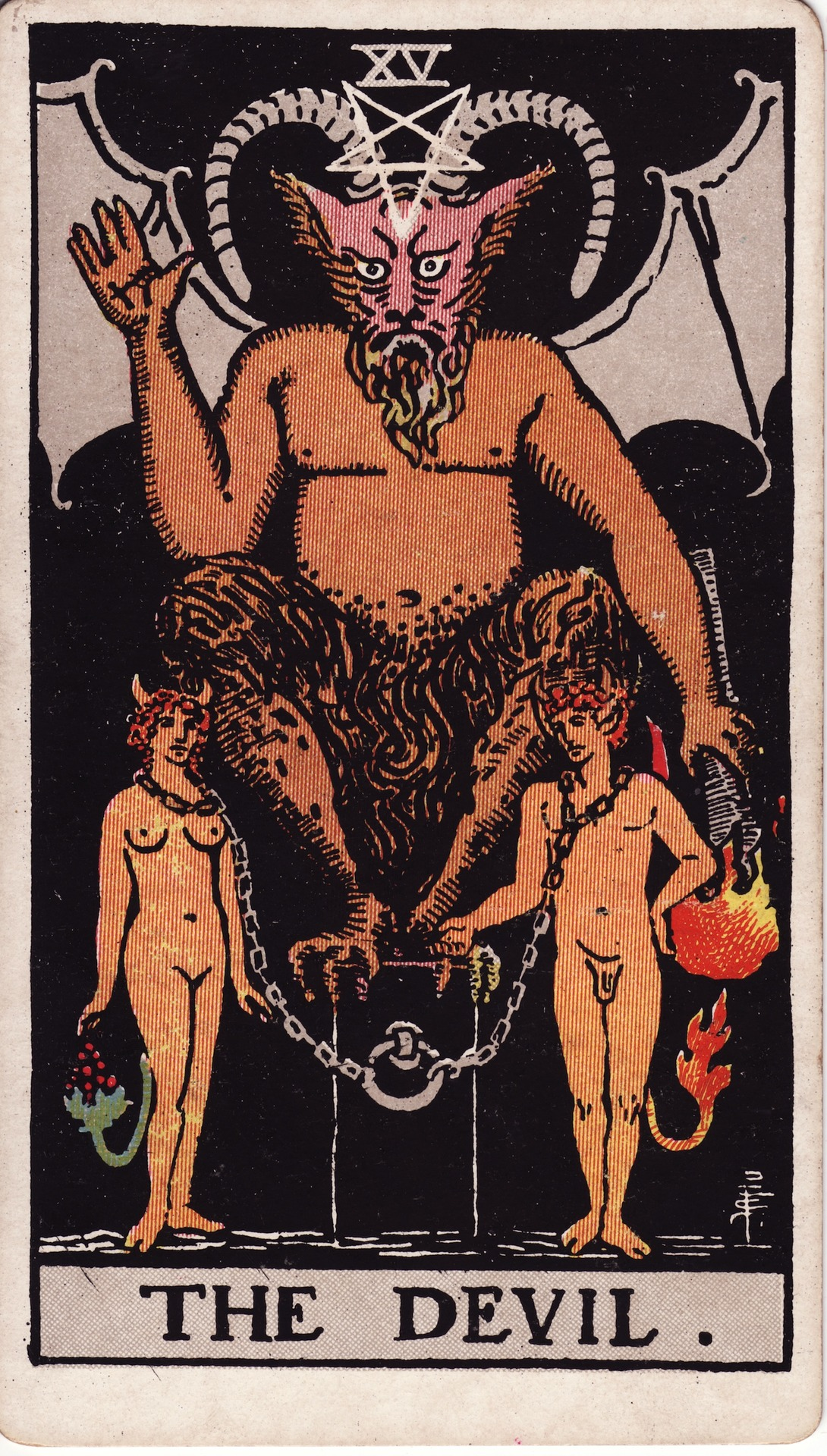
XV – The Devil

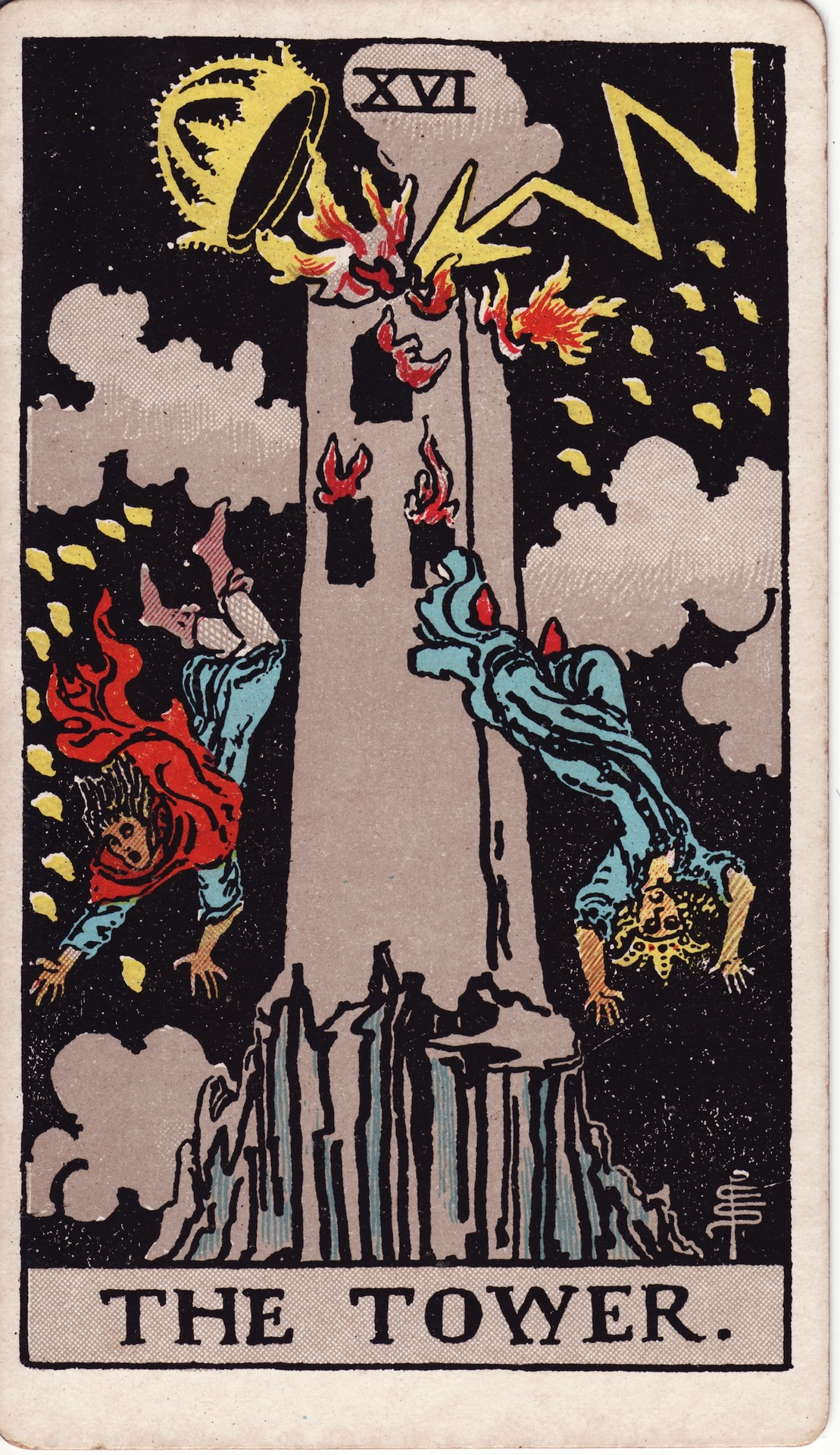
XVI – The Tower

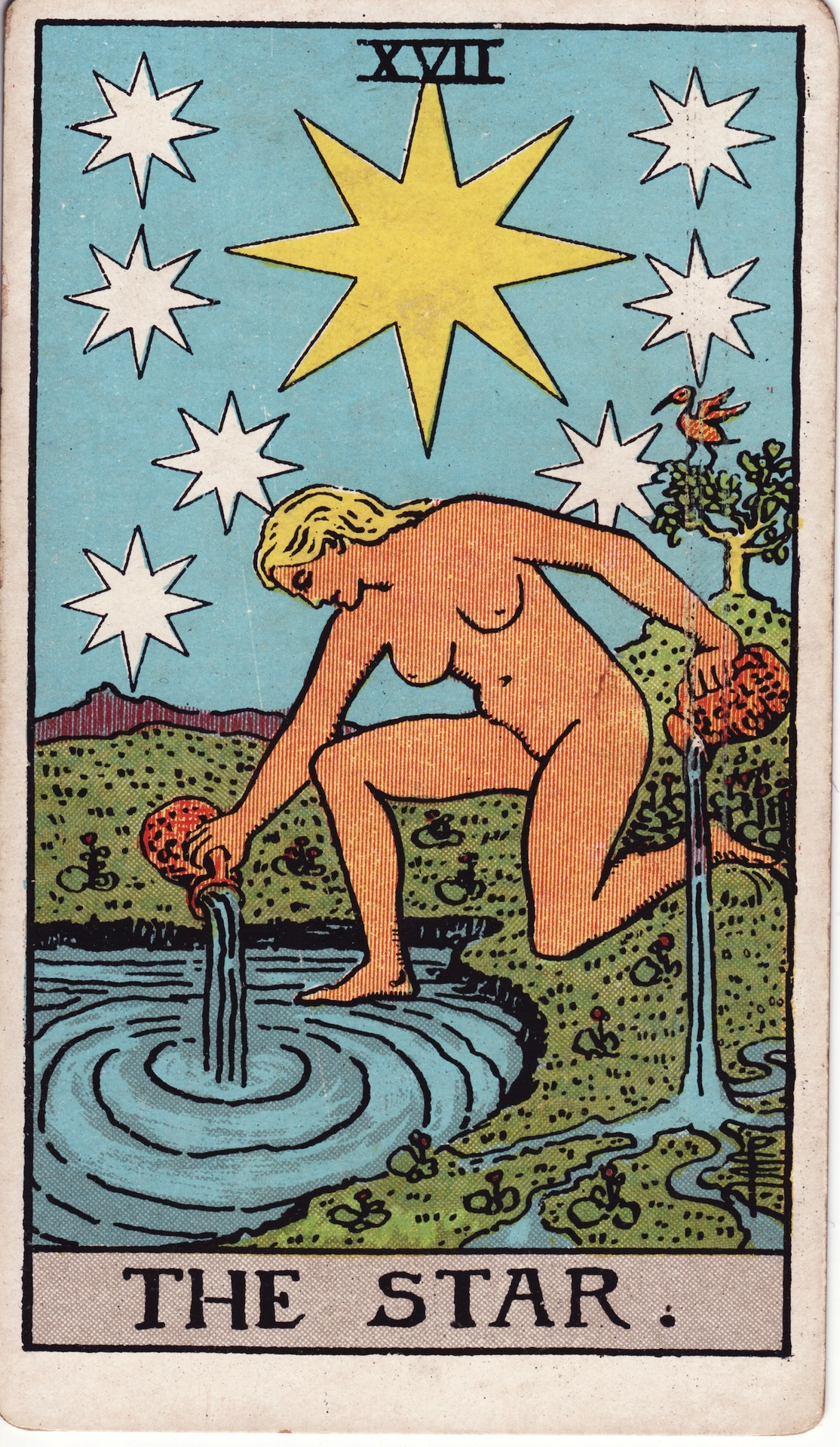
XVII – The Star

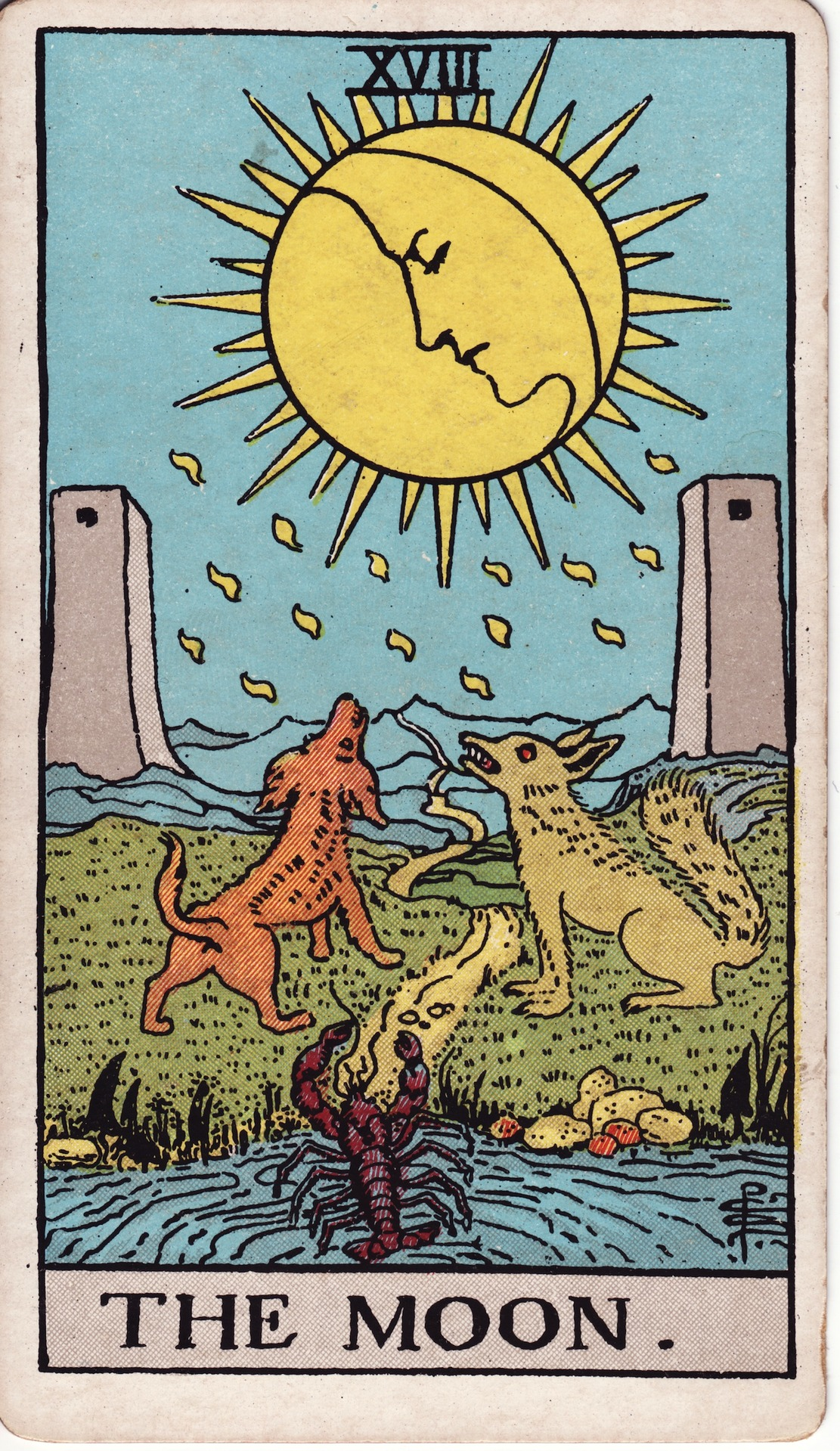
XVIII – The Moon

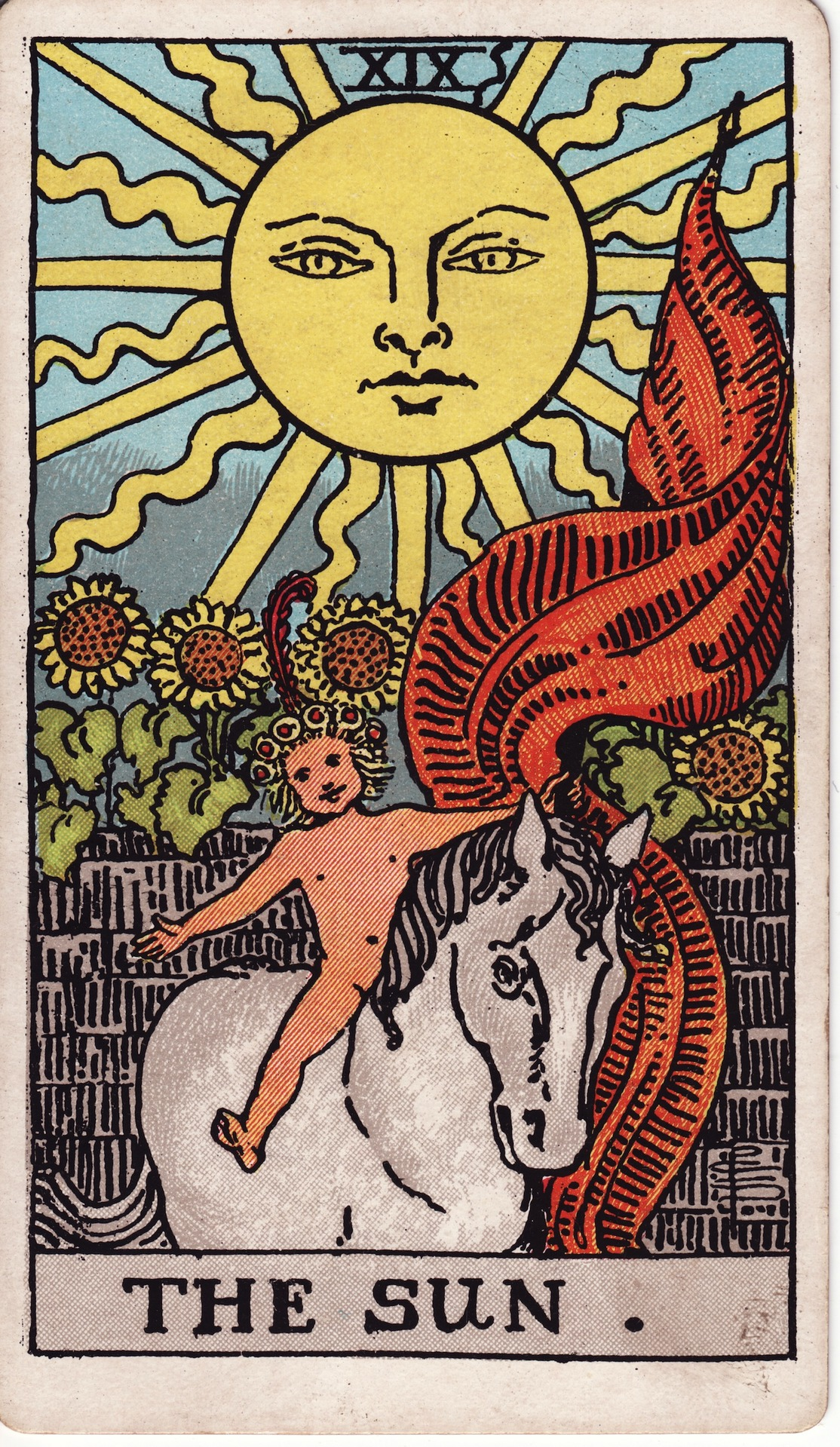
XIX – The Sun

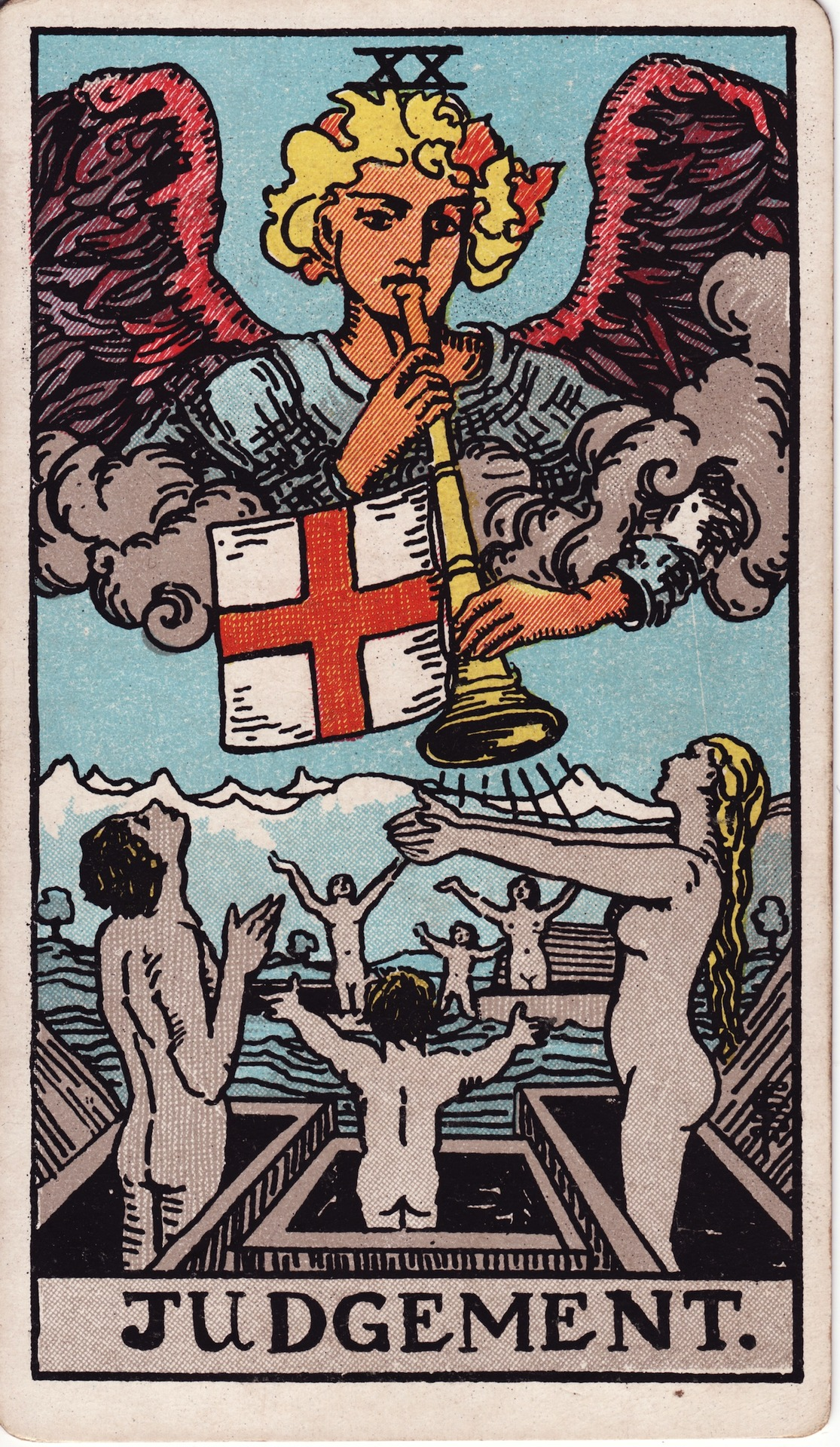
XX – Judgement

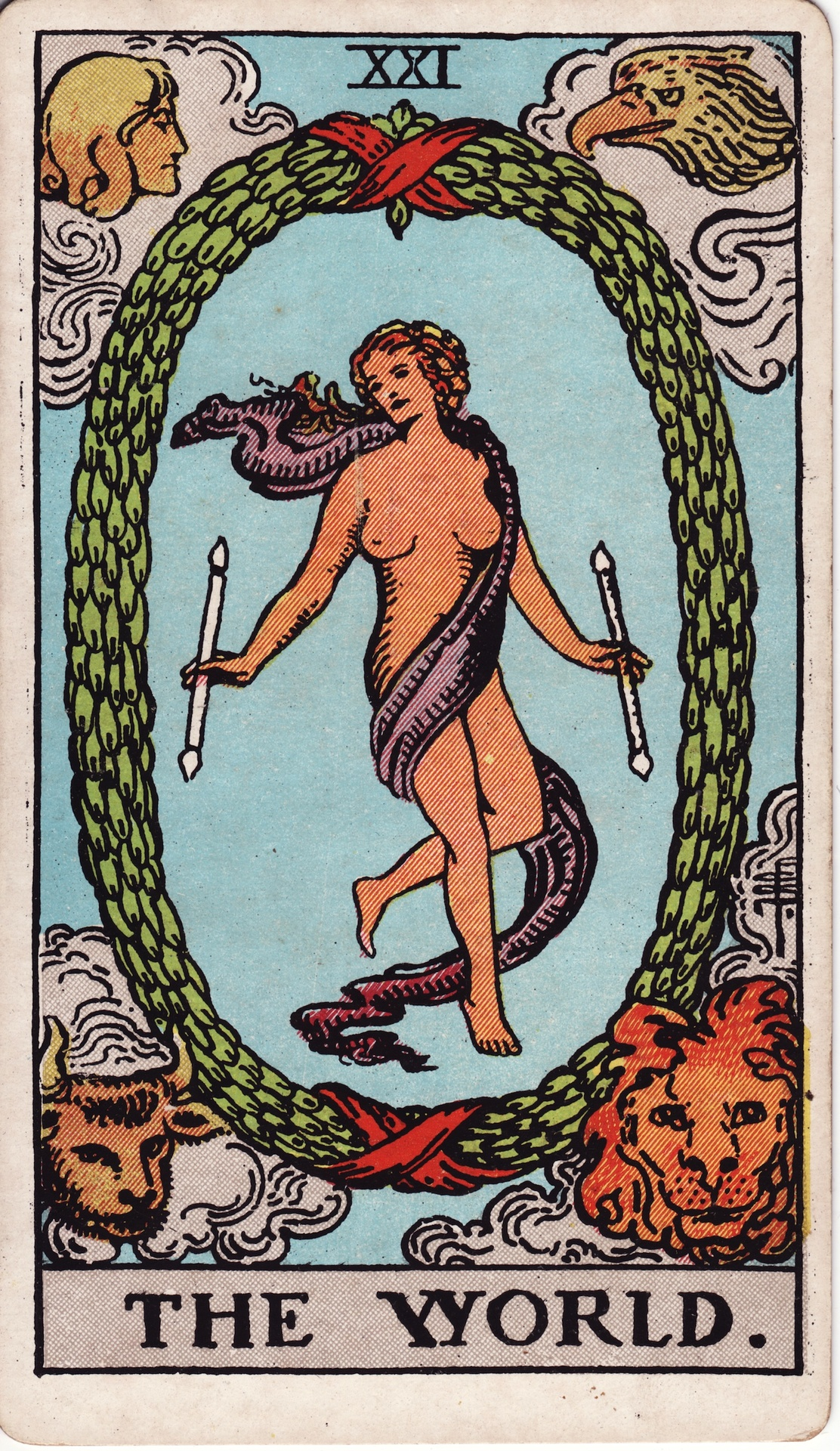
XXI – The World

== Minor Arcana ==
The Minor Arcana of the Rider–Waite tarot are illustrated below.

=== Wands ===
The suit of wands, also known as staves in some decks, corresponding to the clubs of modern playing cards:

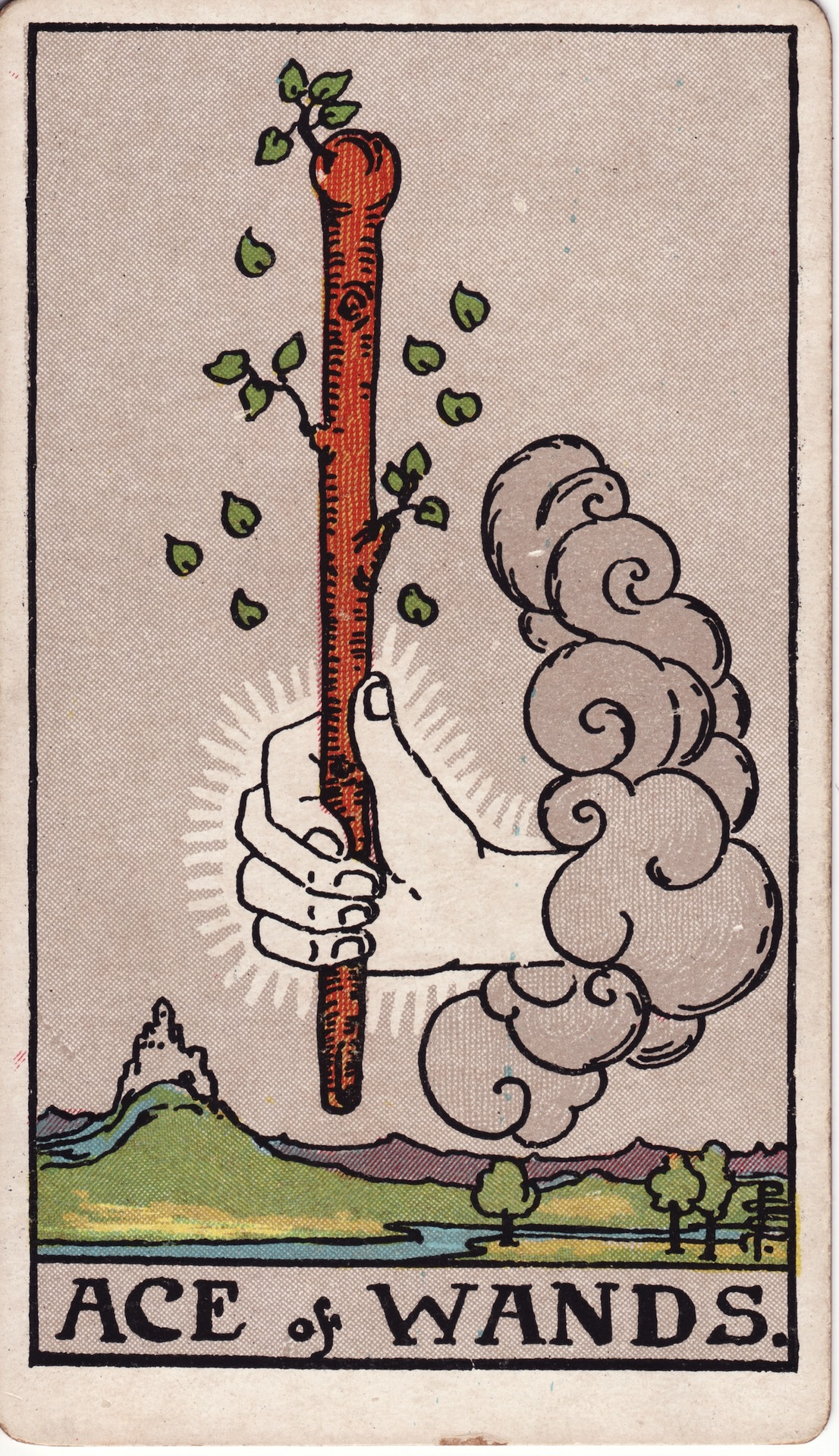
Ace of Wands

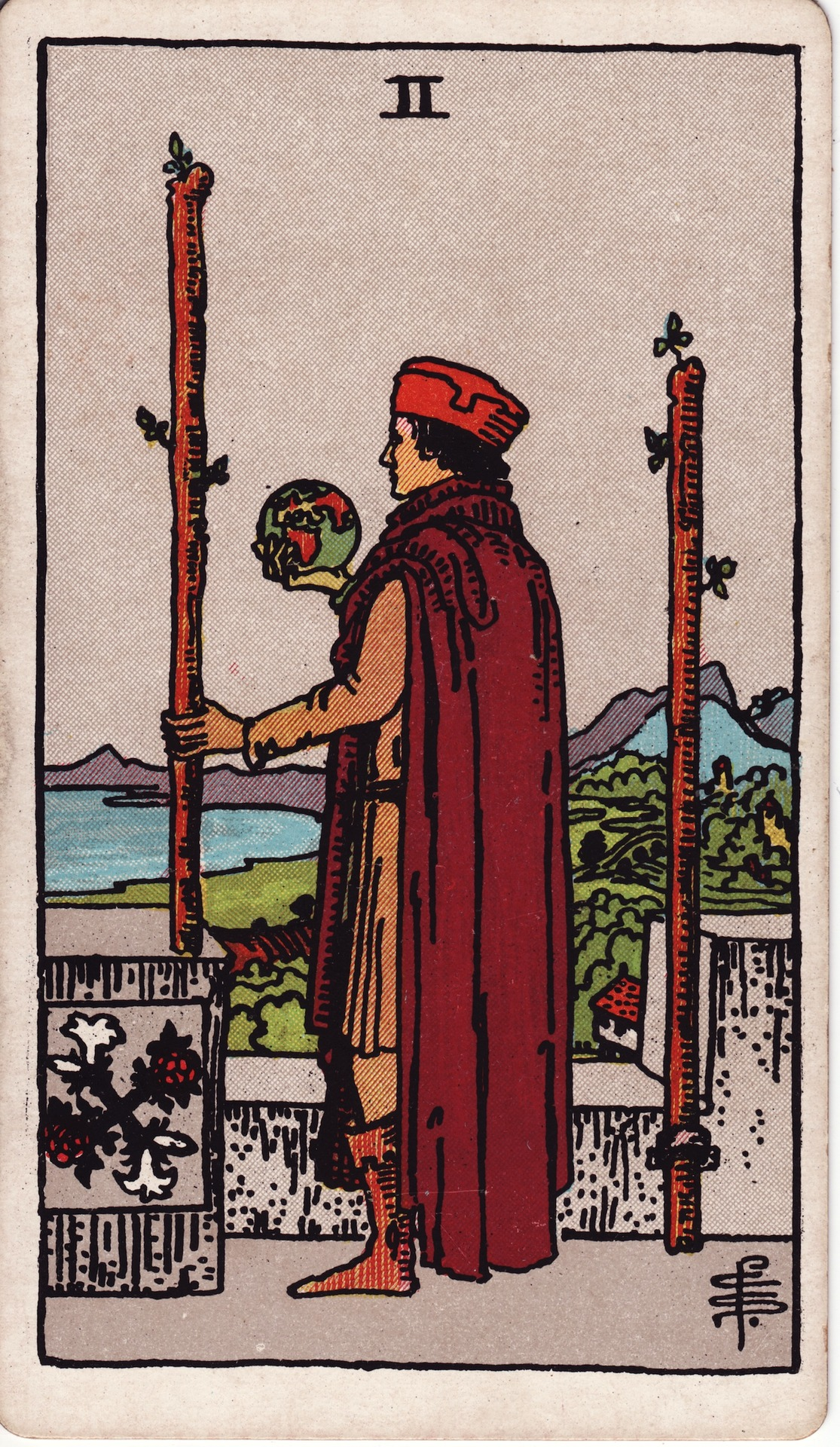
Two of Wands

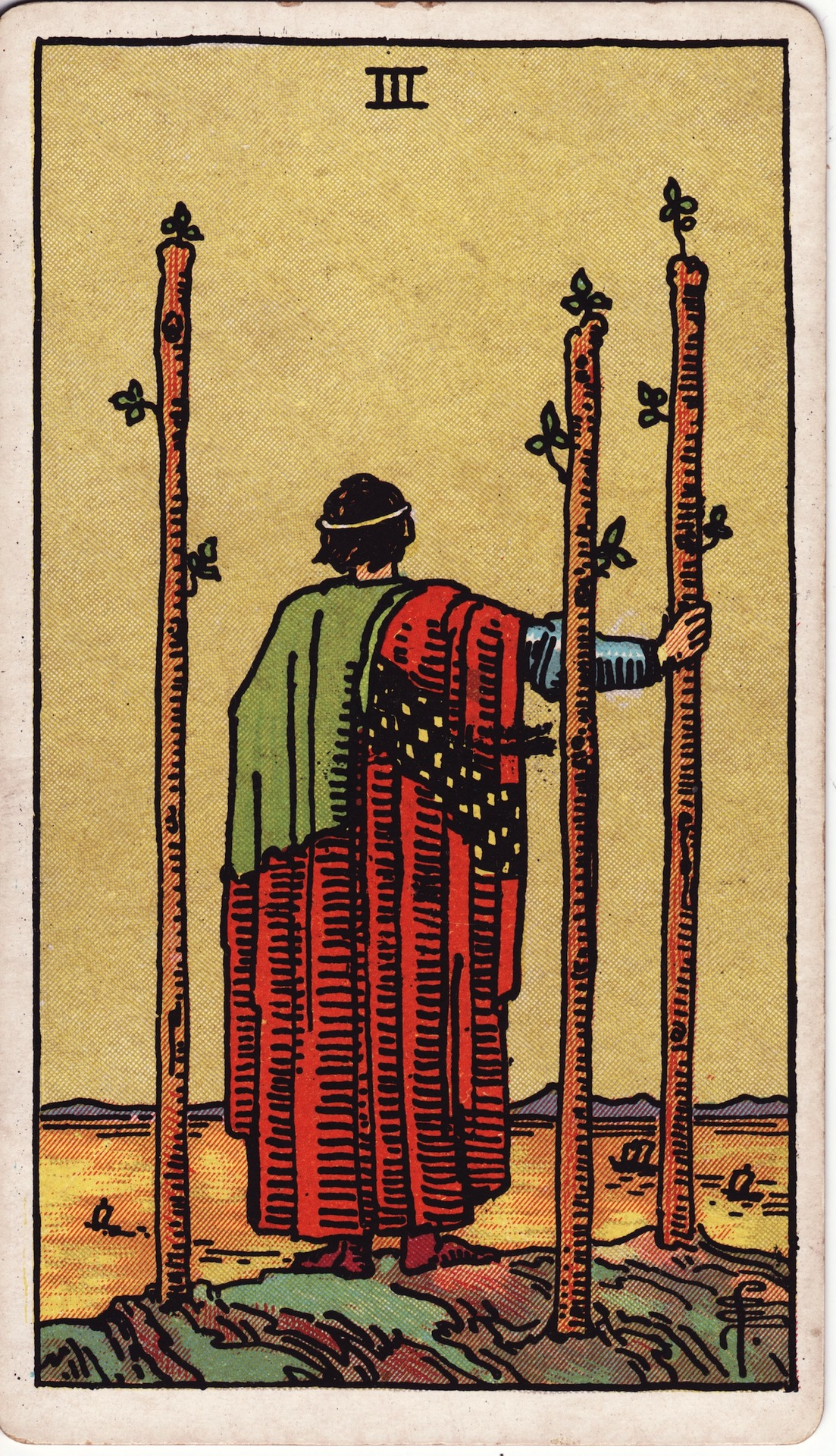
Three of Wands

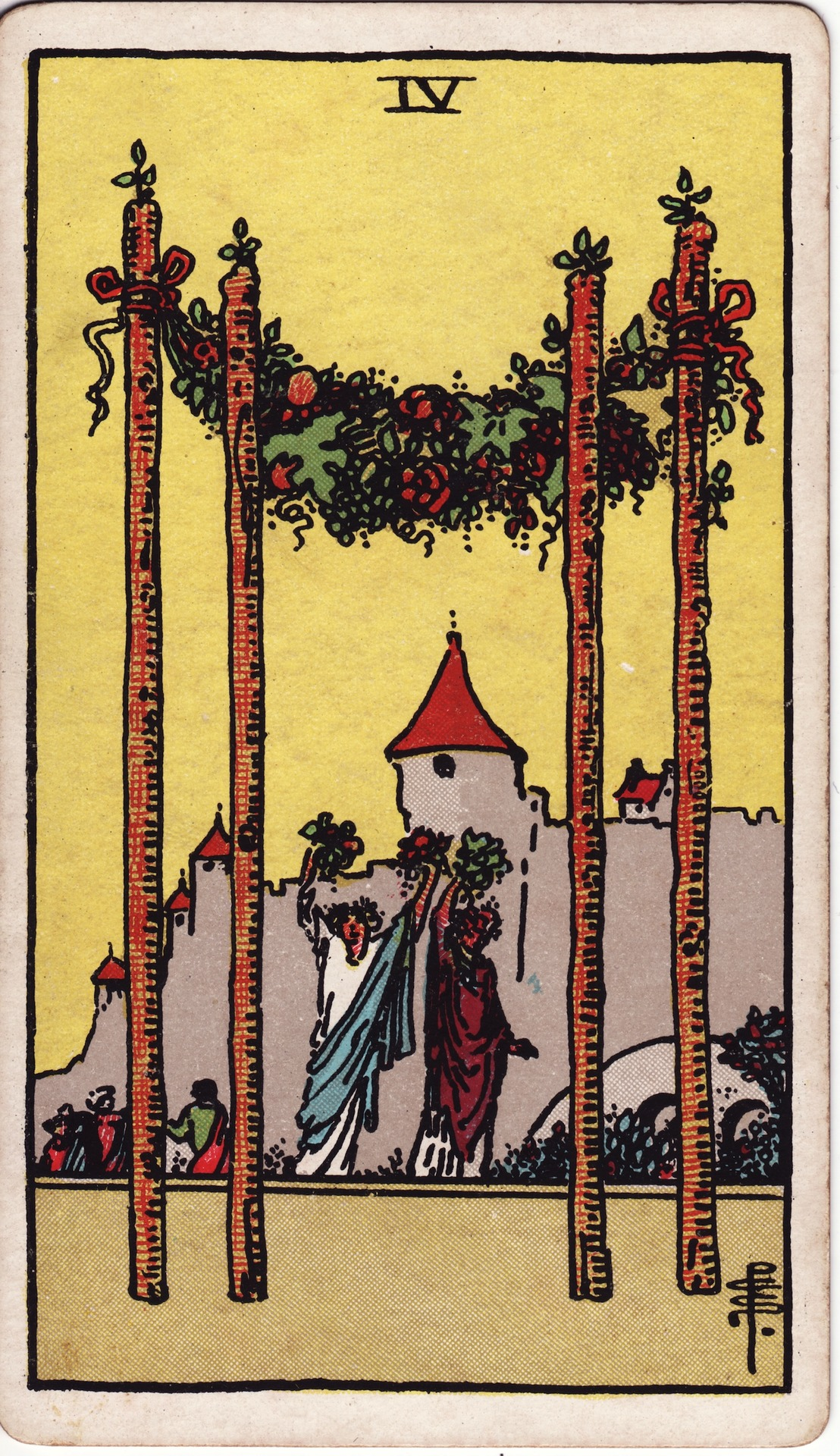
Four of Wands

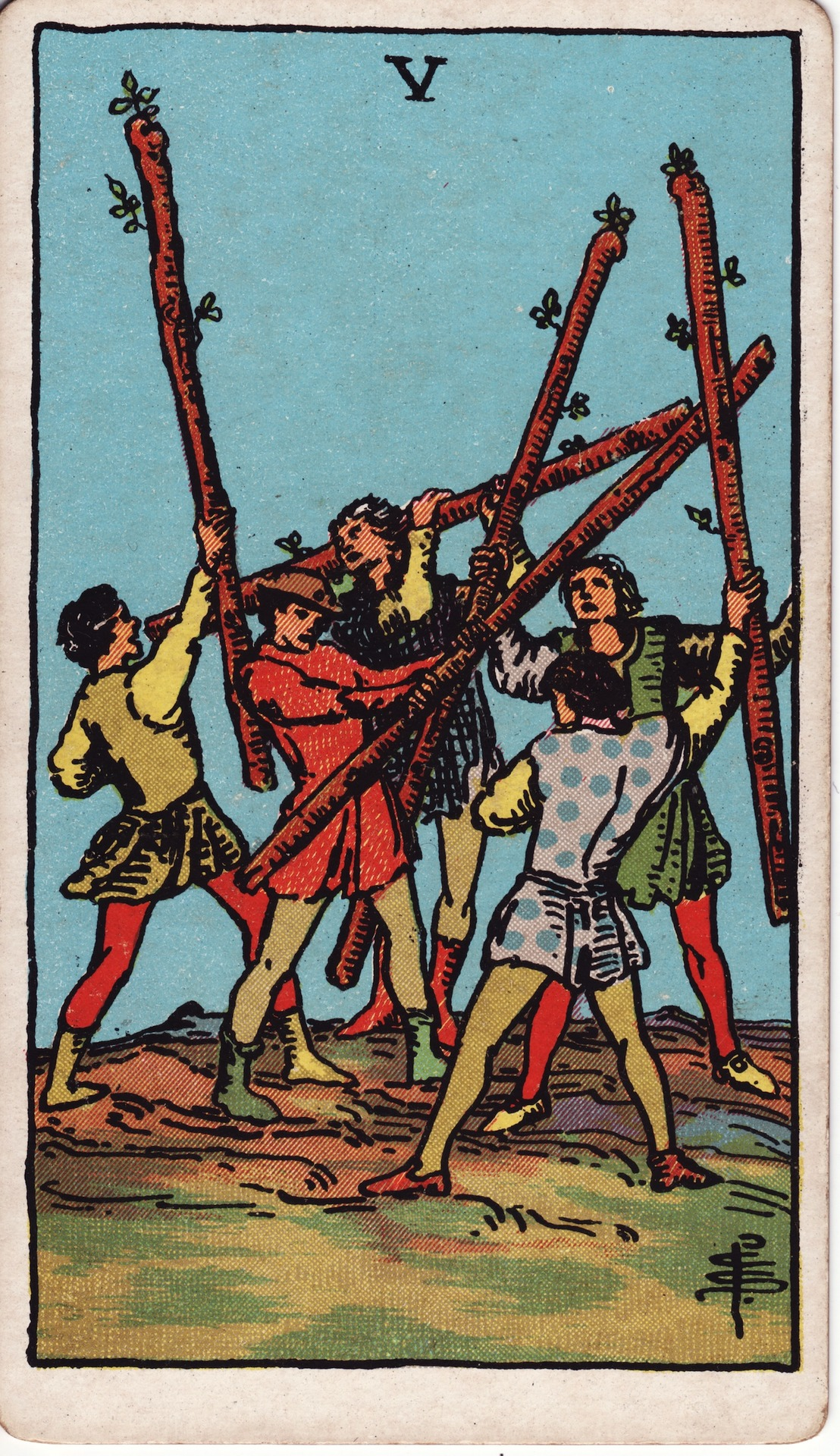
Five of Wands

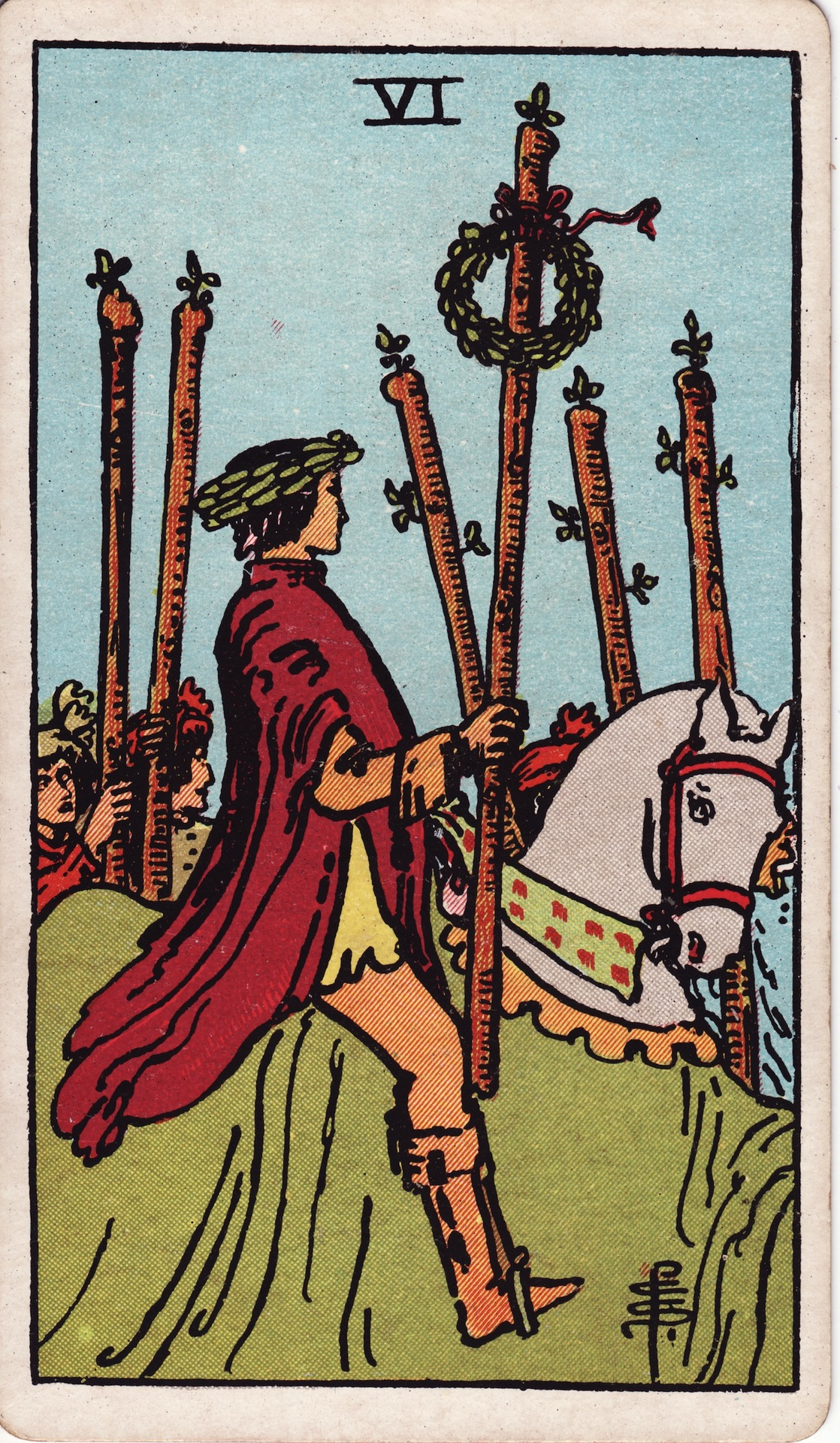
Six of Wands

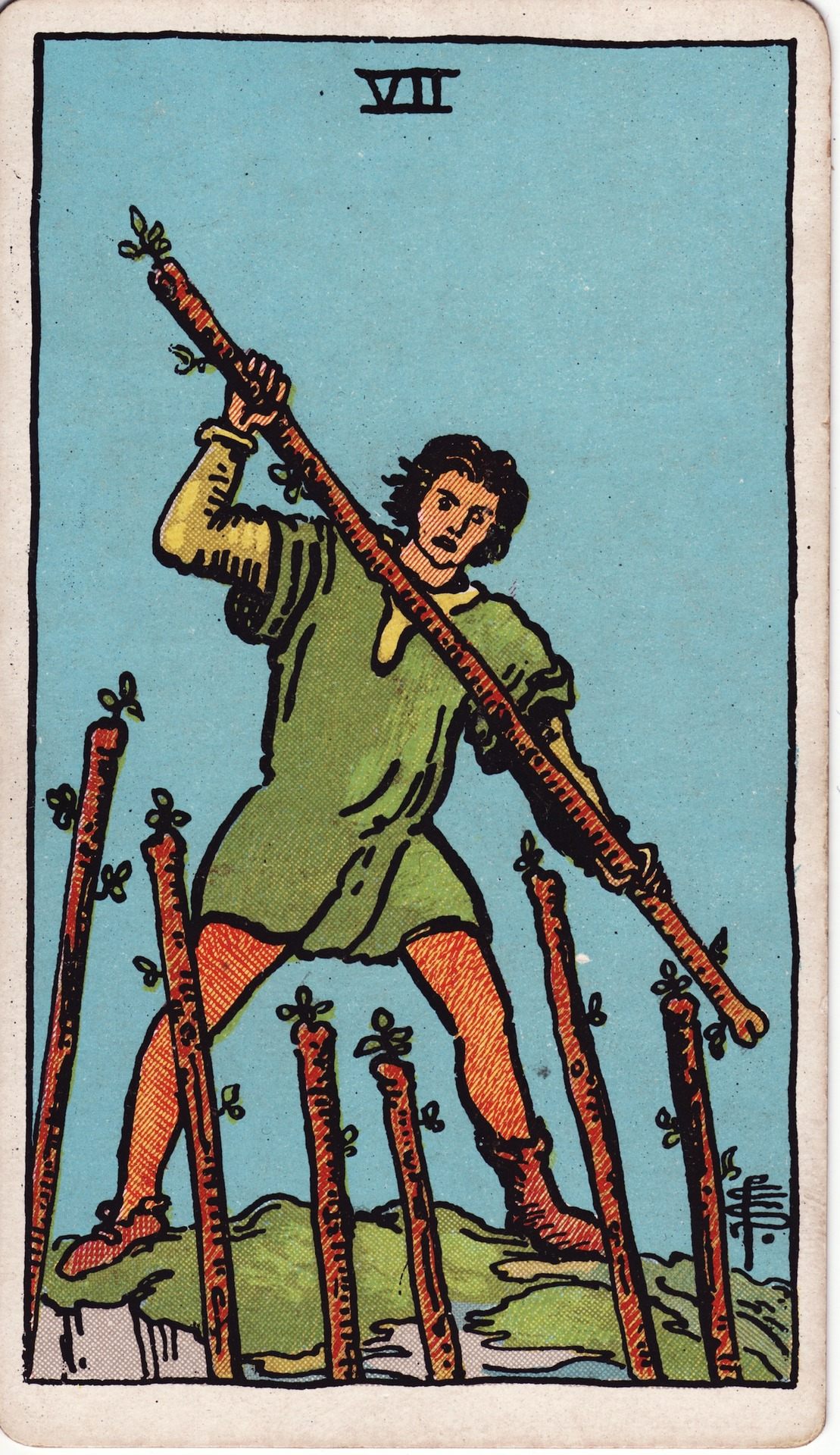
Seven of Wands

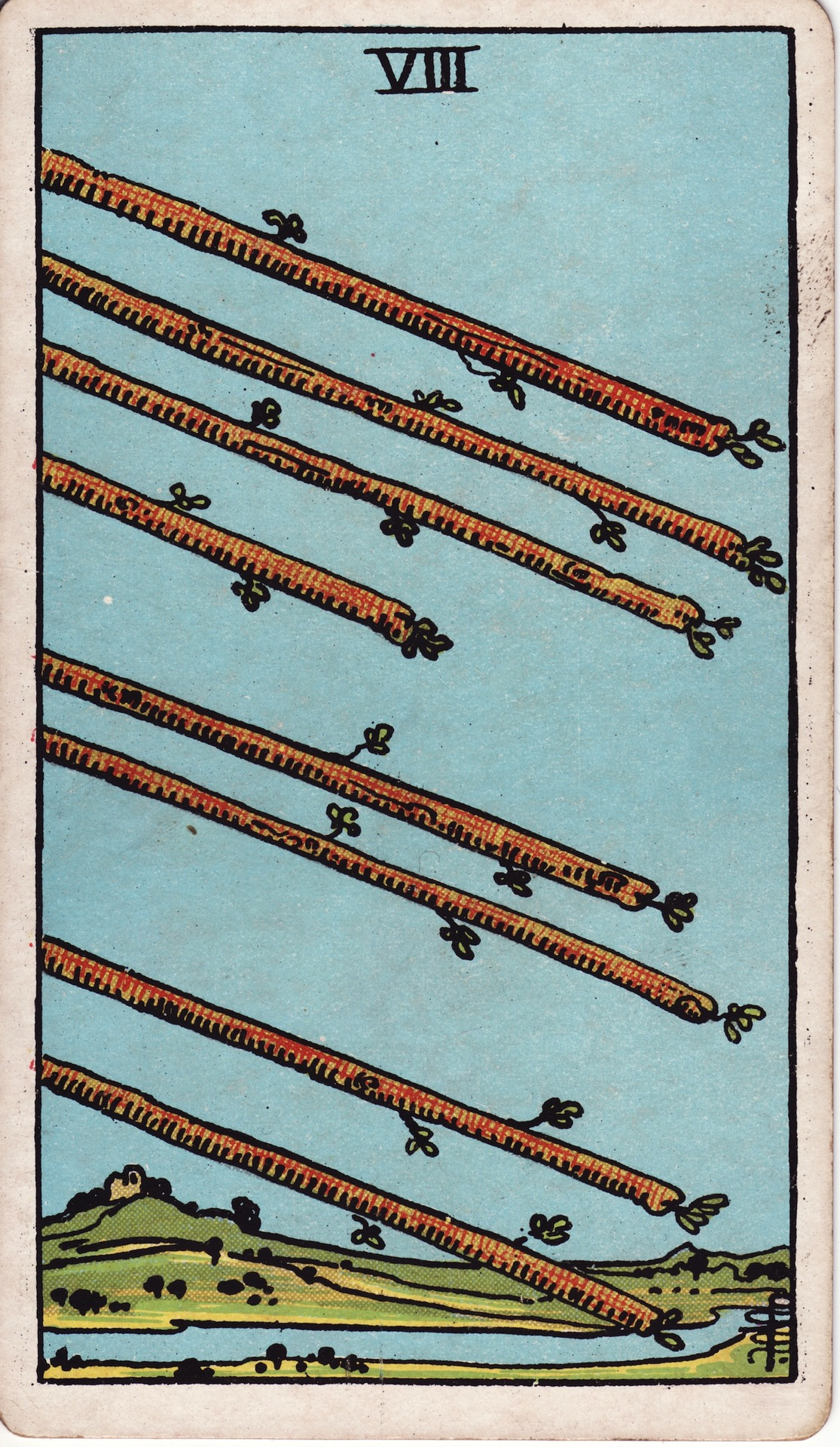
Eight of Wands

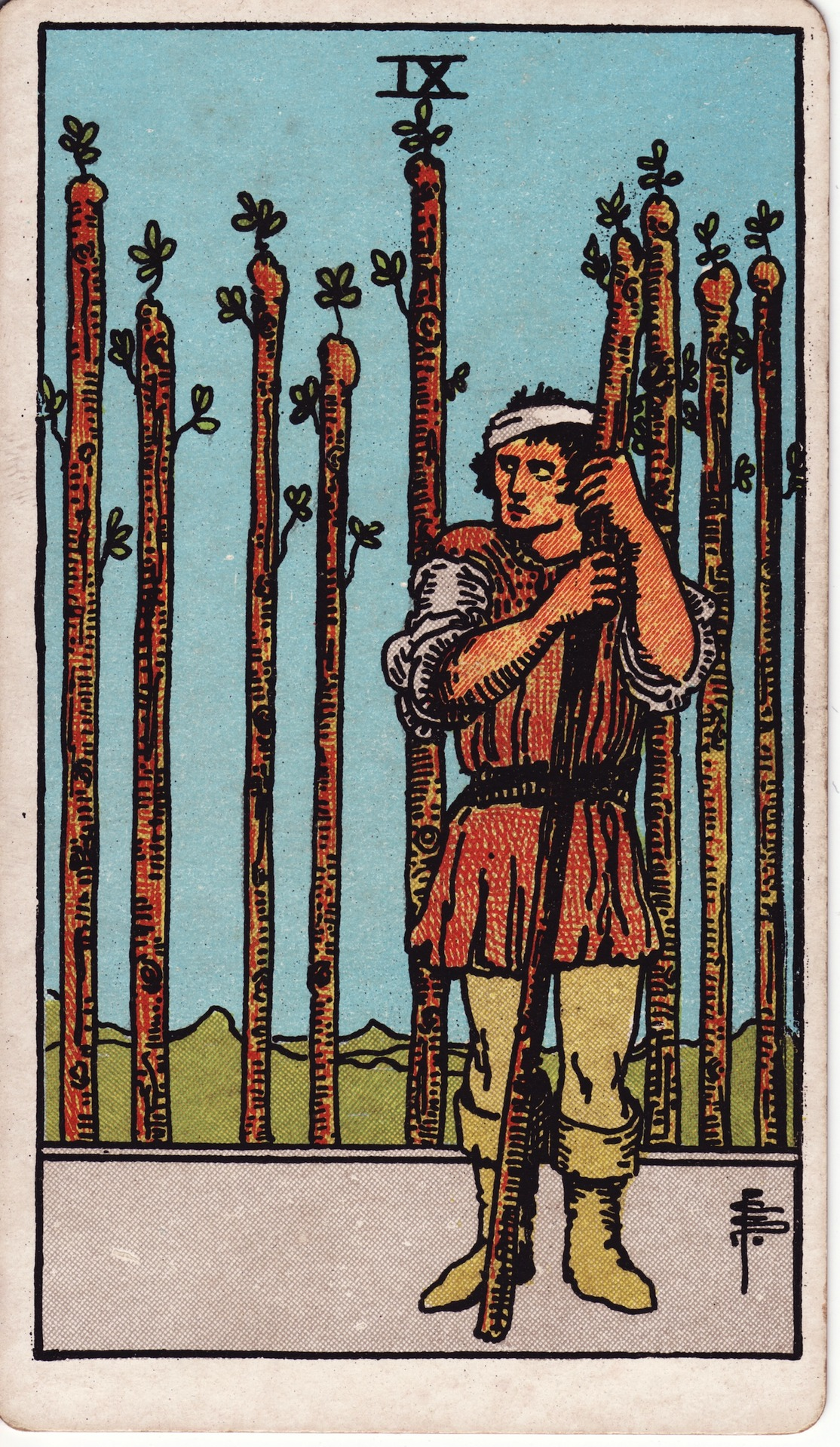
Nine of Wands

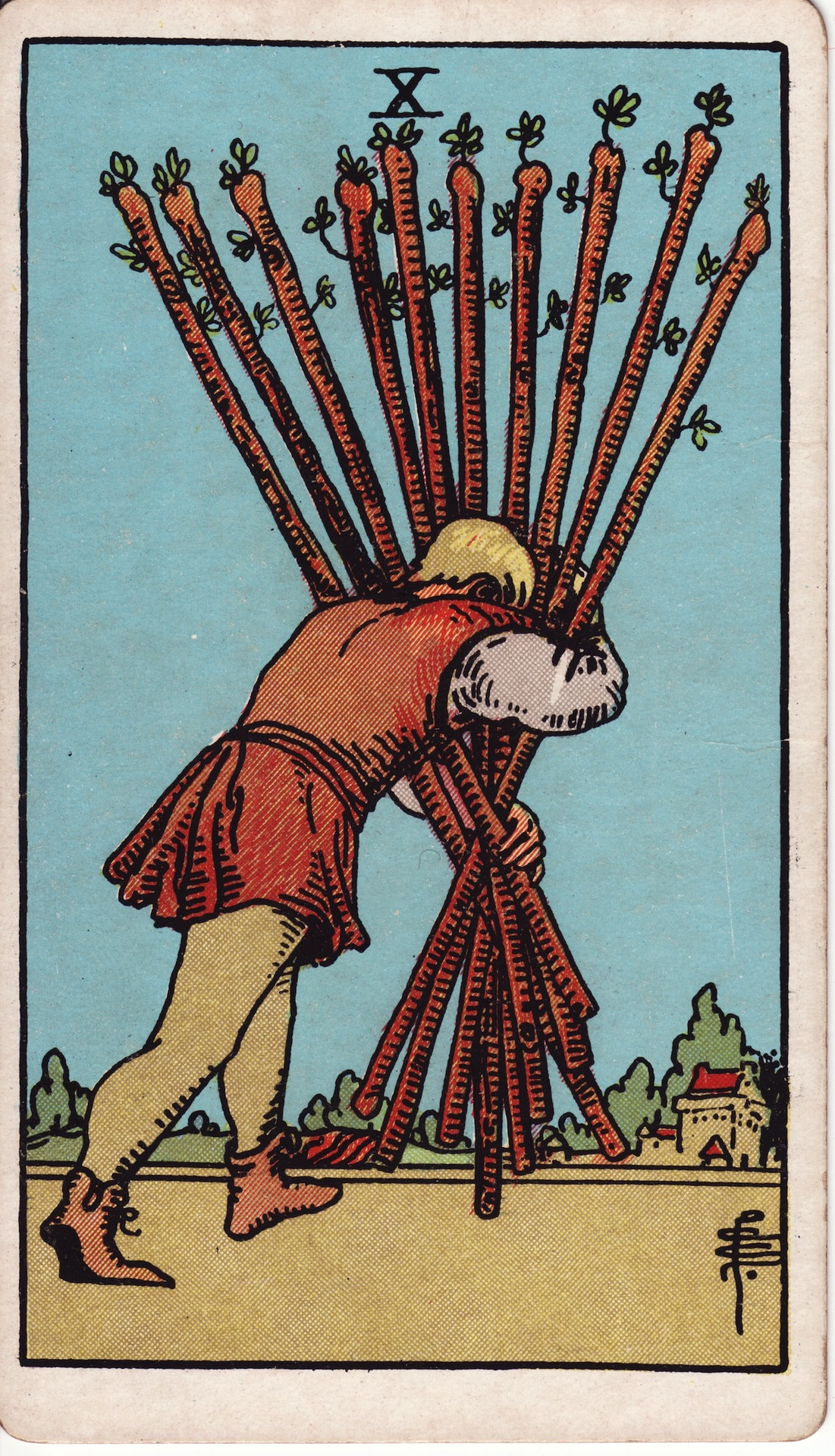
Ten of Wands

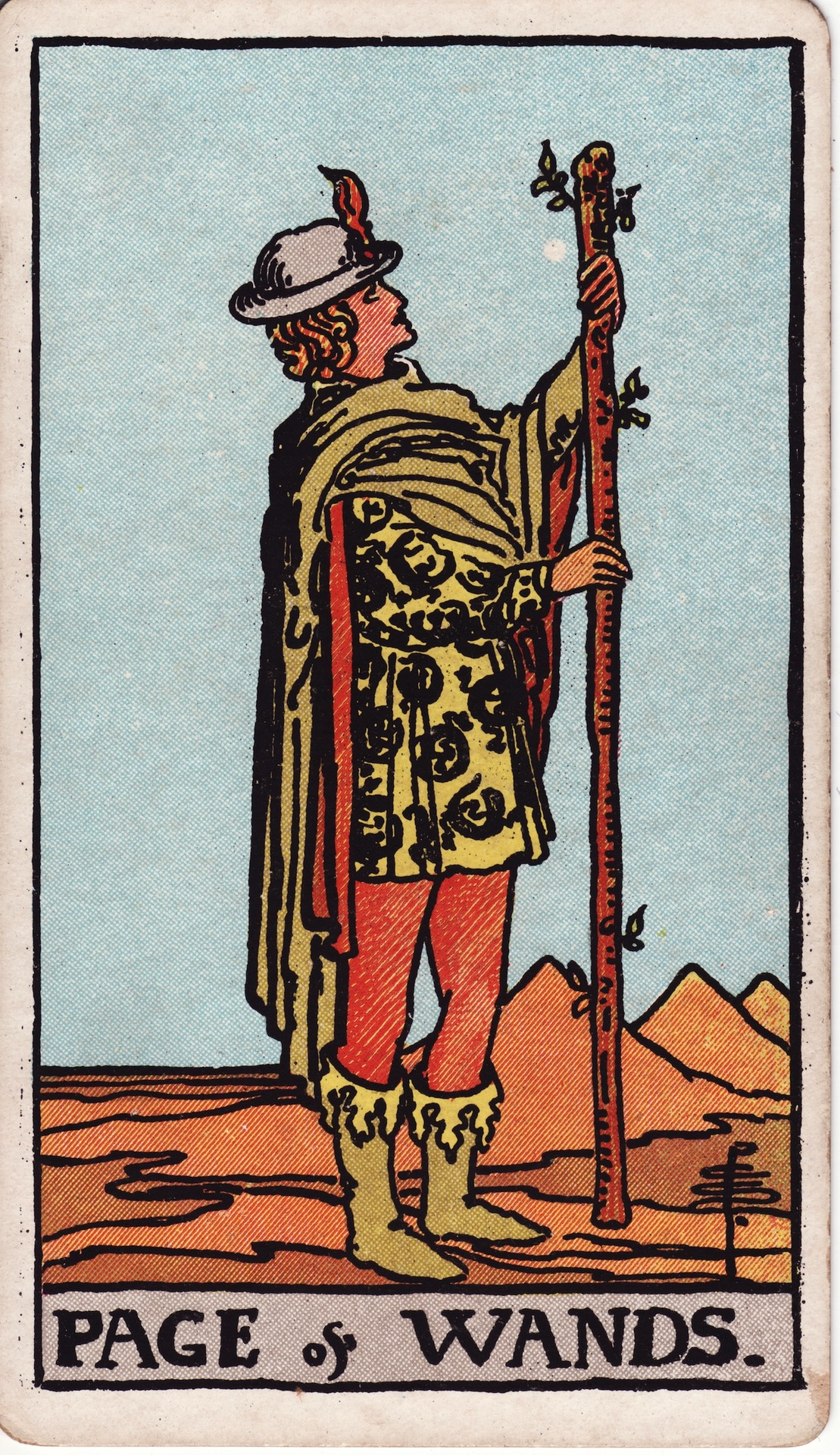
Page of Wands

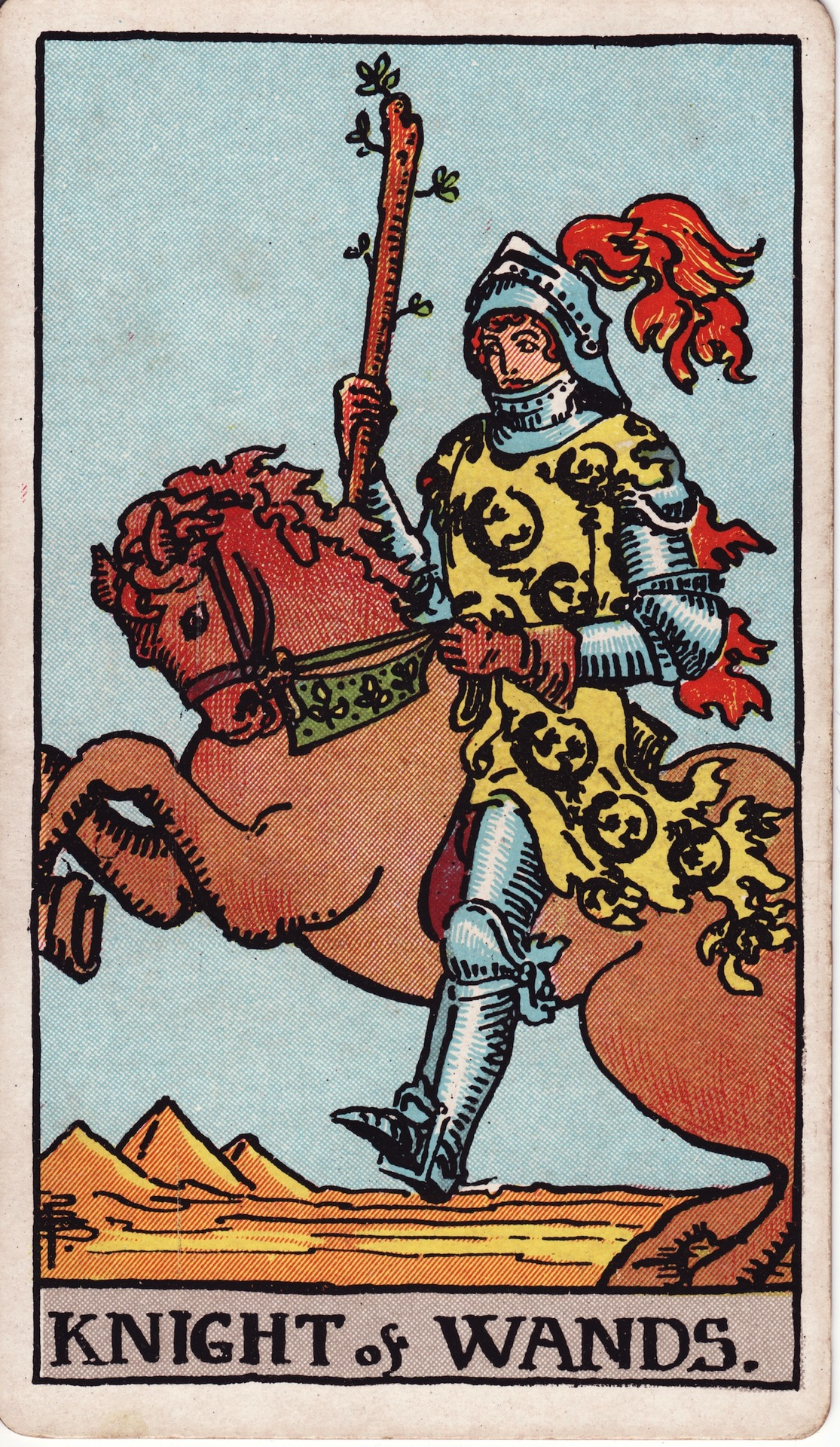
Knight of Wands

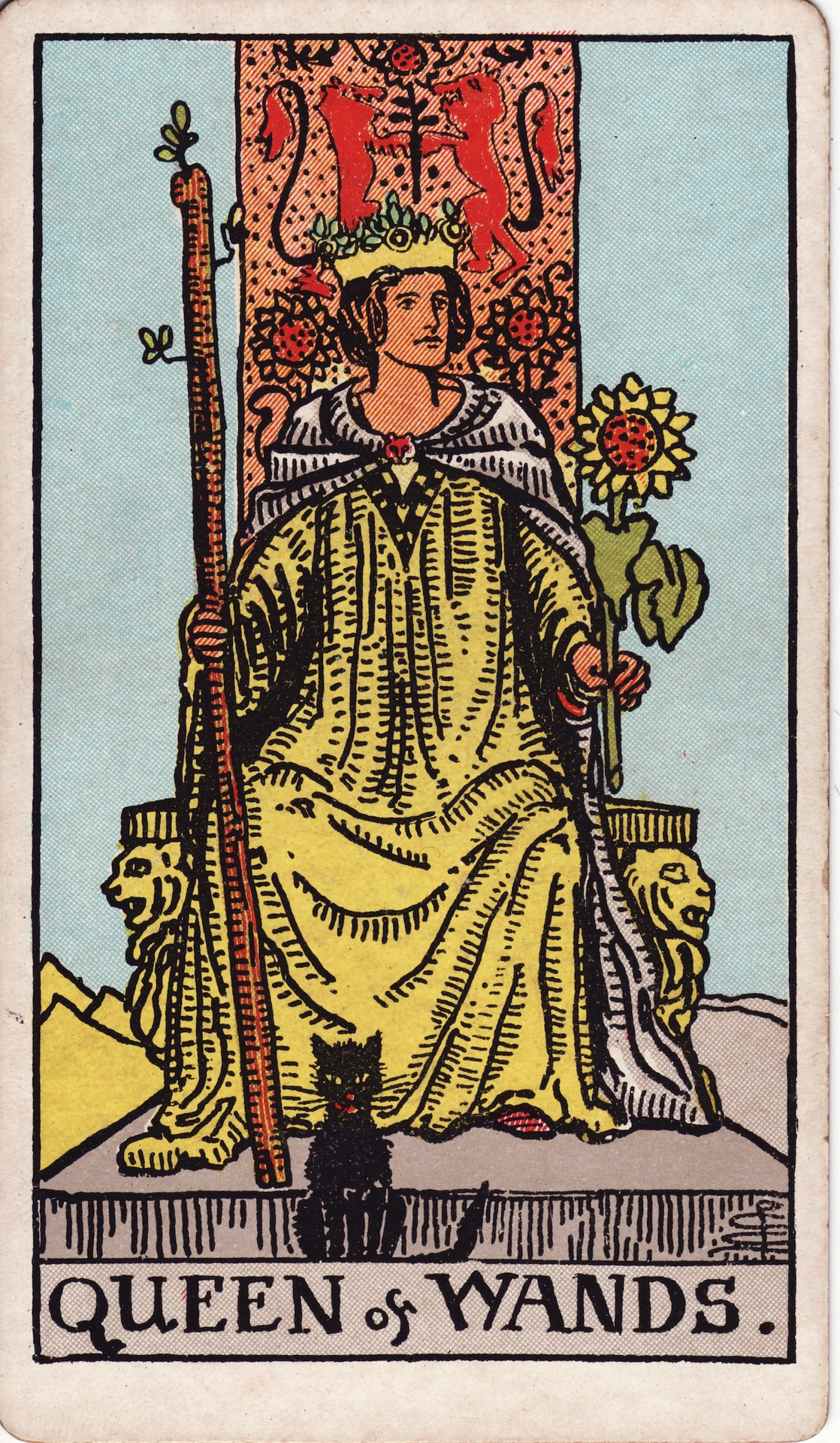
Queen of Wands

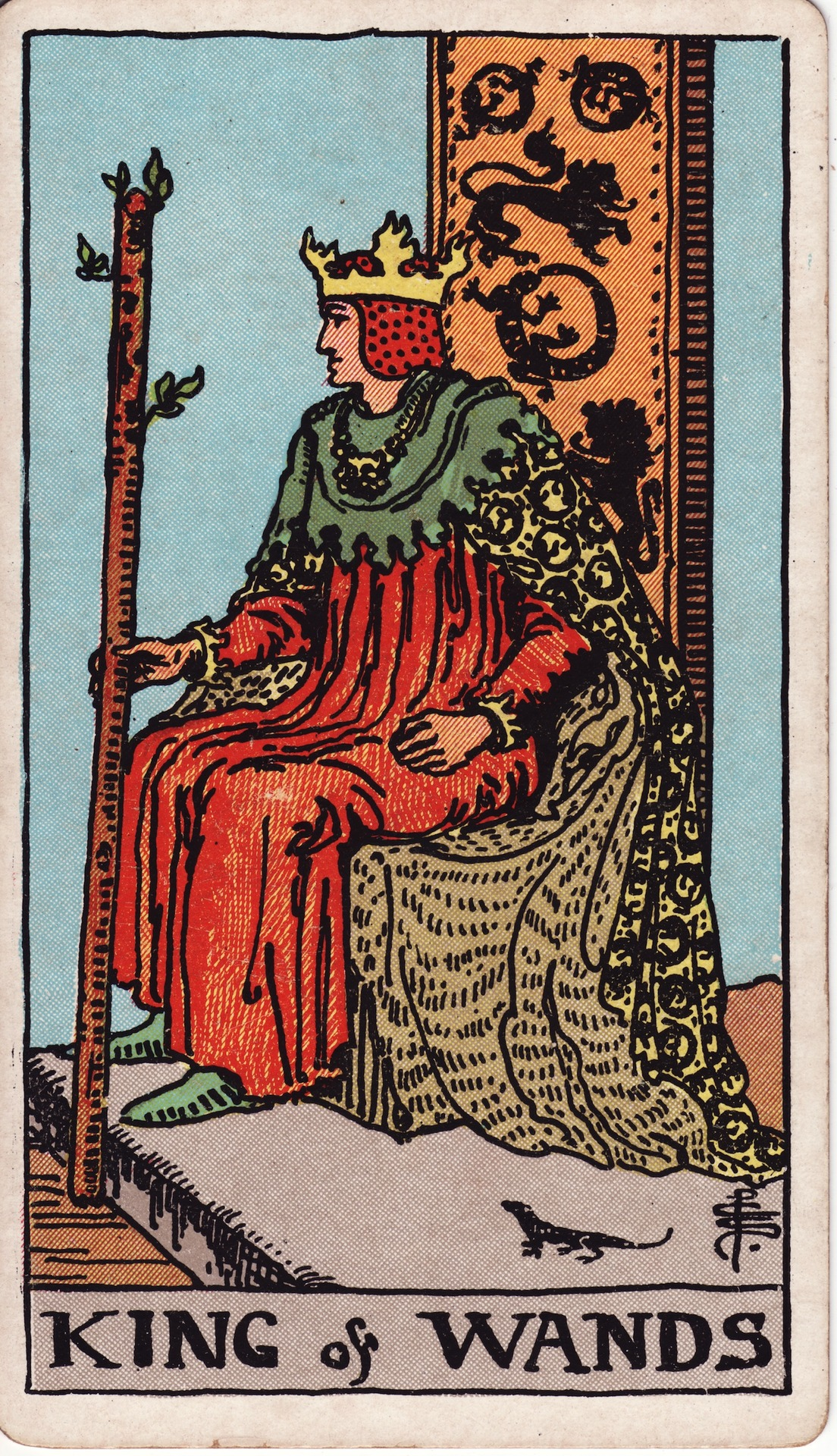
King of Wands

=== Cups ===
The suit of cups, goblets, or chalices, corresponding to the hearts of modern playing cards:

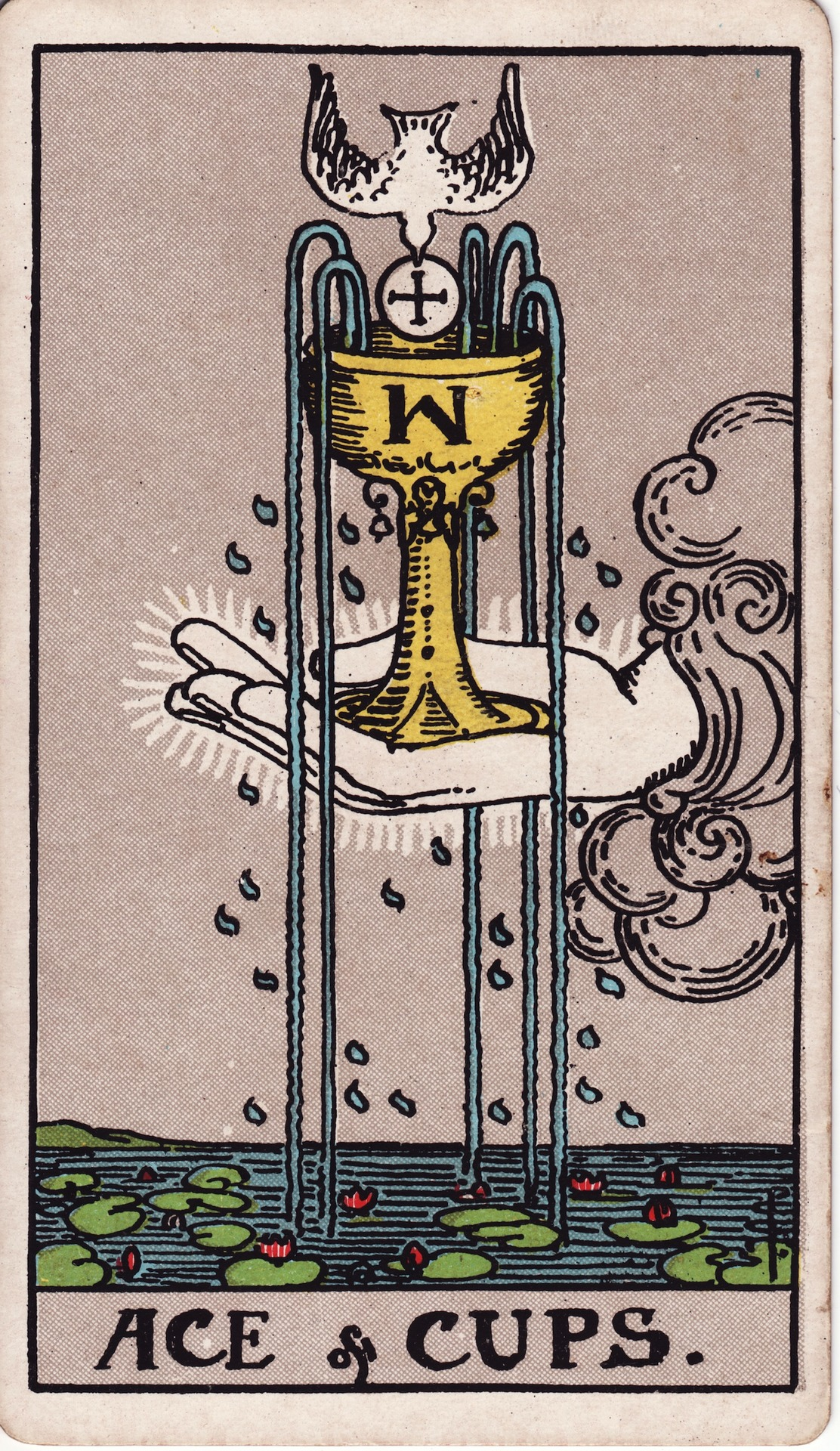
Ace of Cups

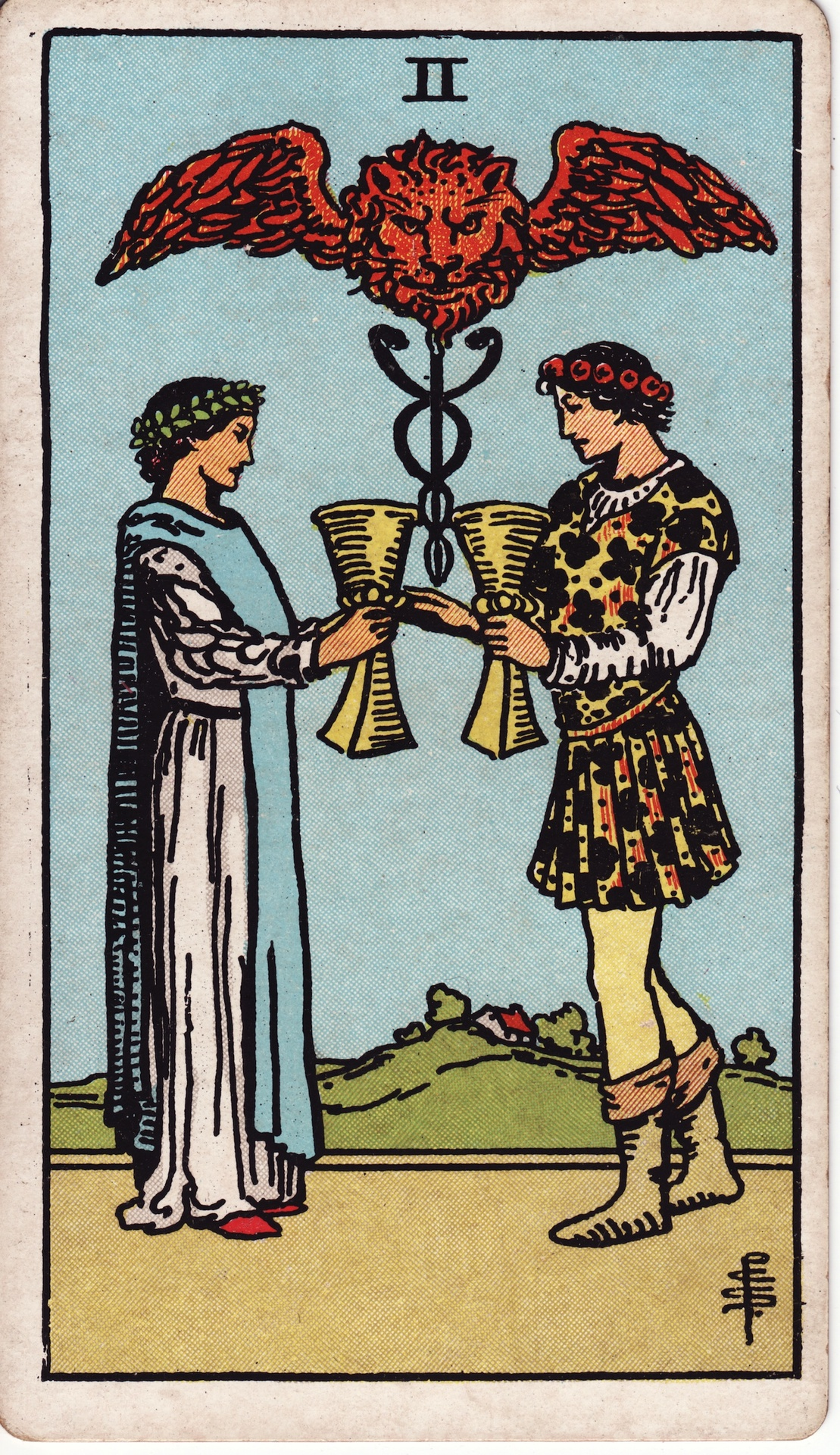
Two of Cups

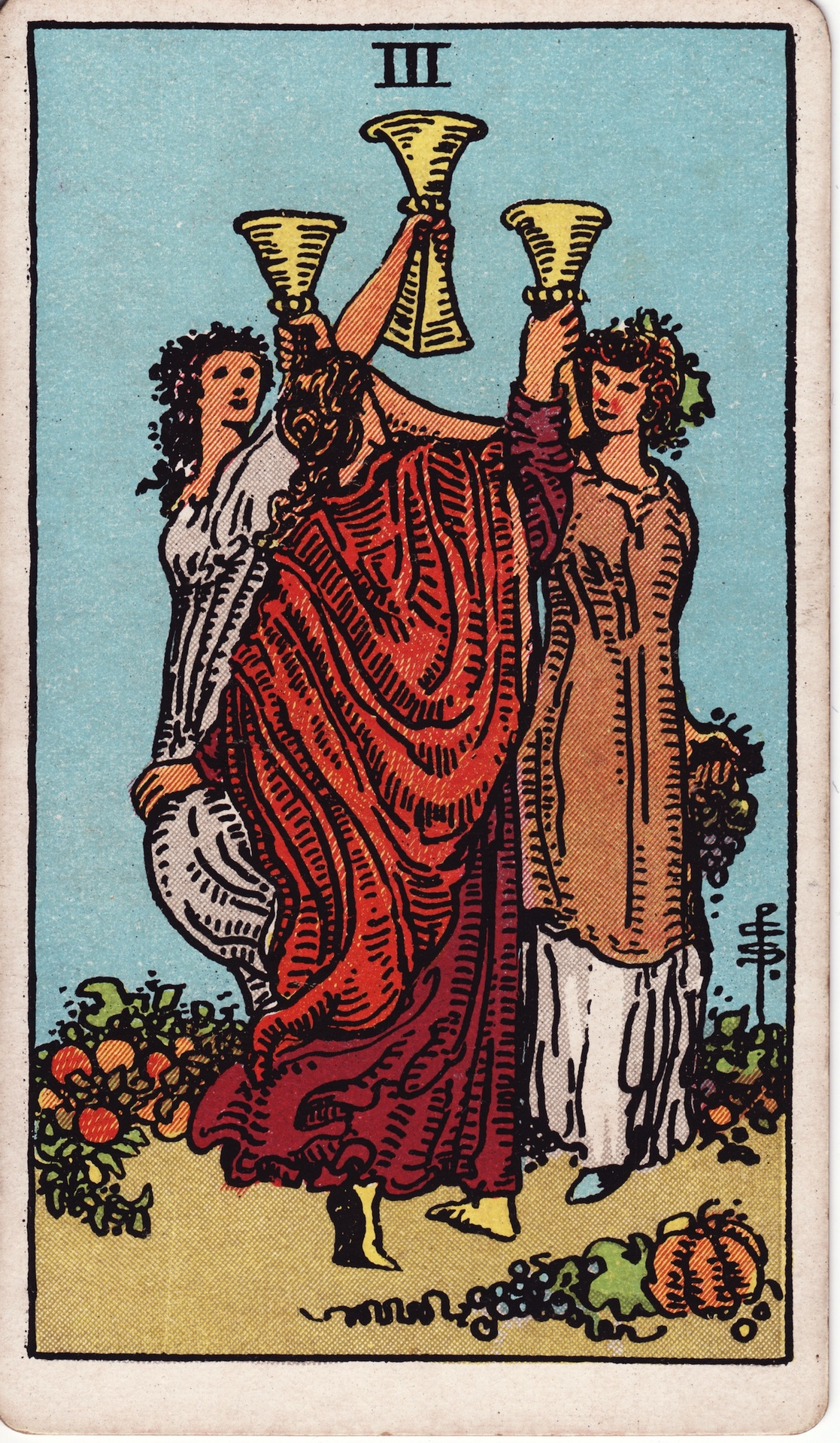
Three of Cups

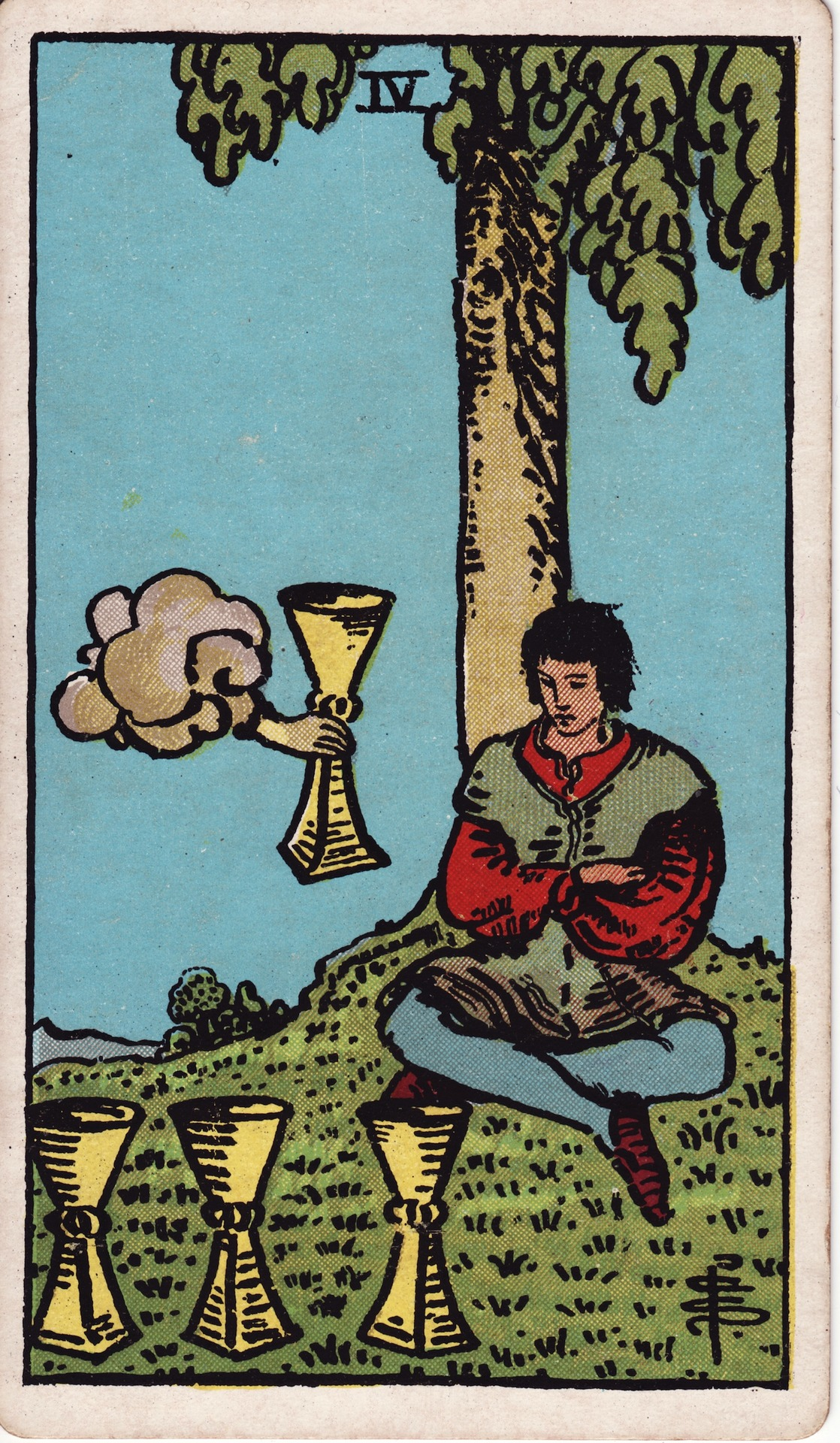
Four of Cups

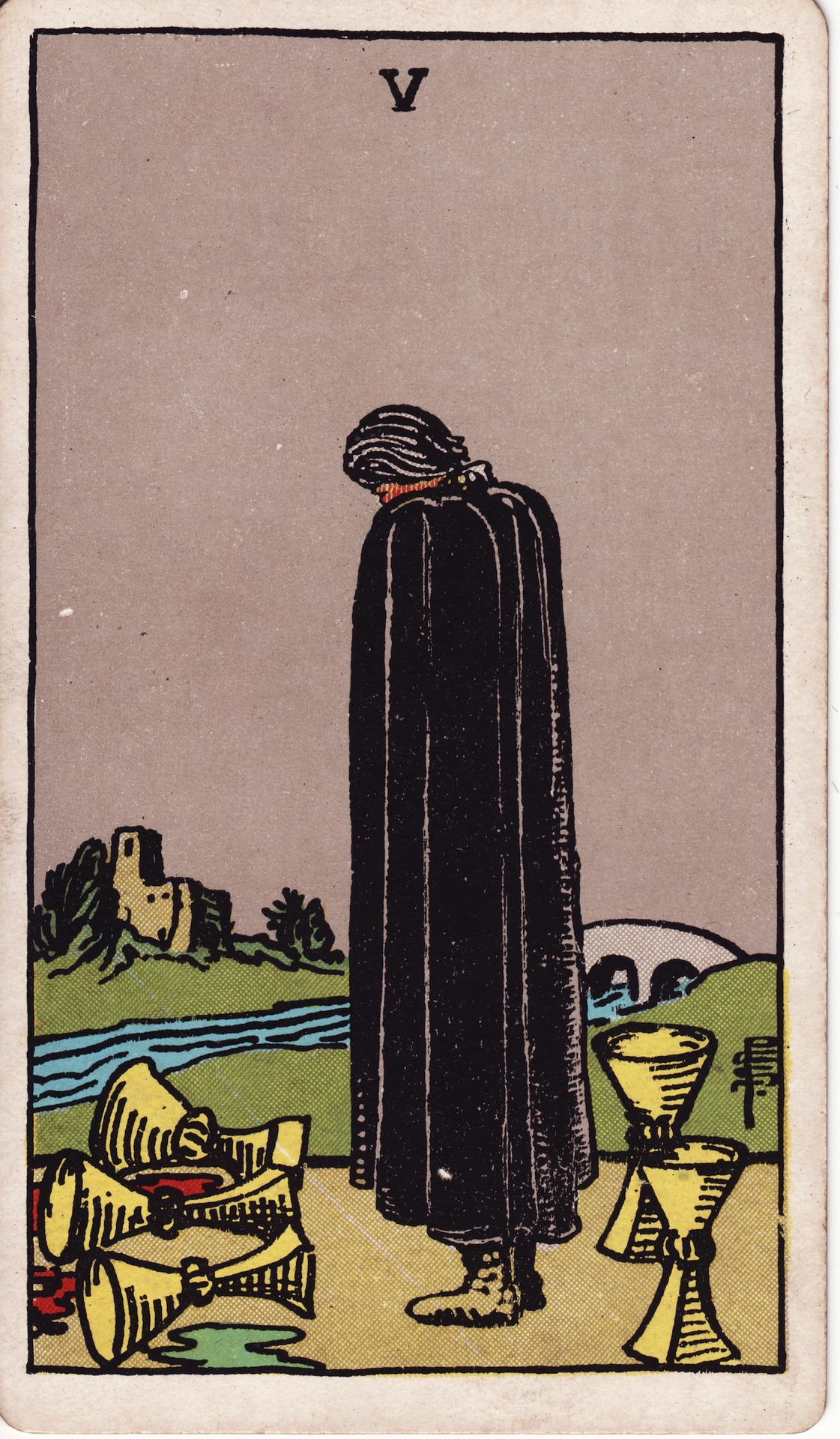
Five of Cups

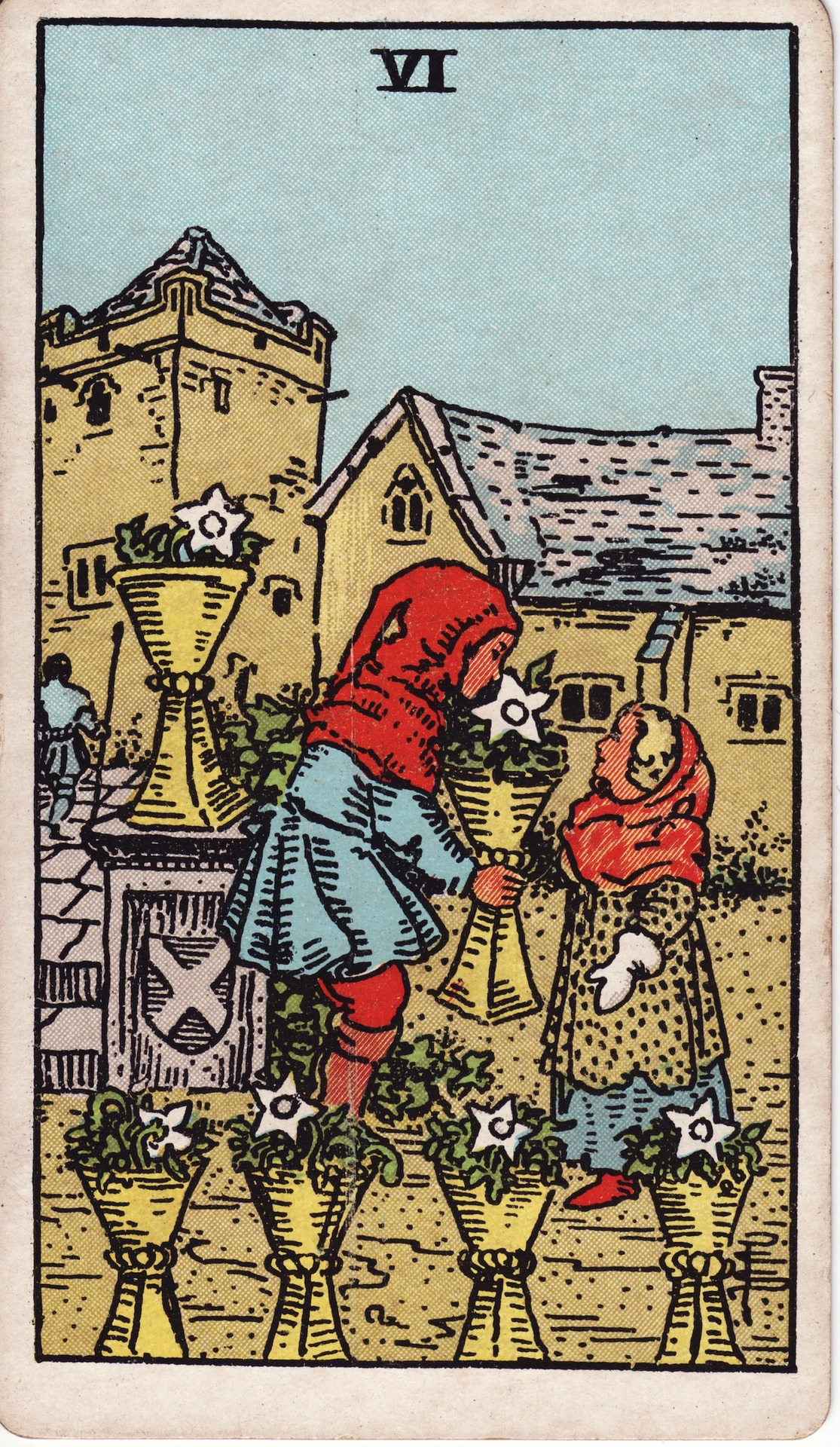
Six of Cups

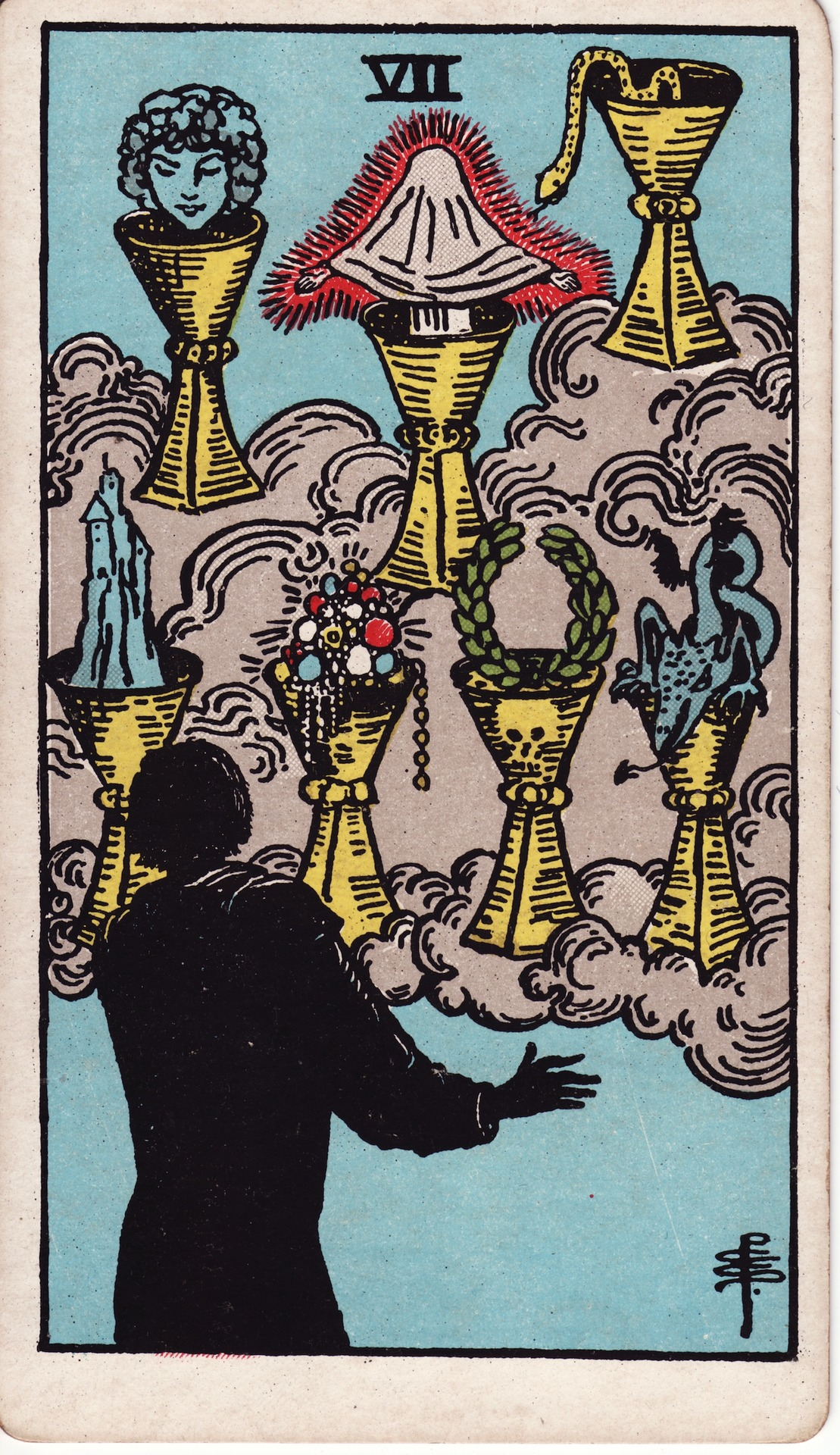
Seven of Cups

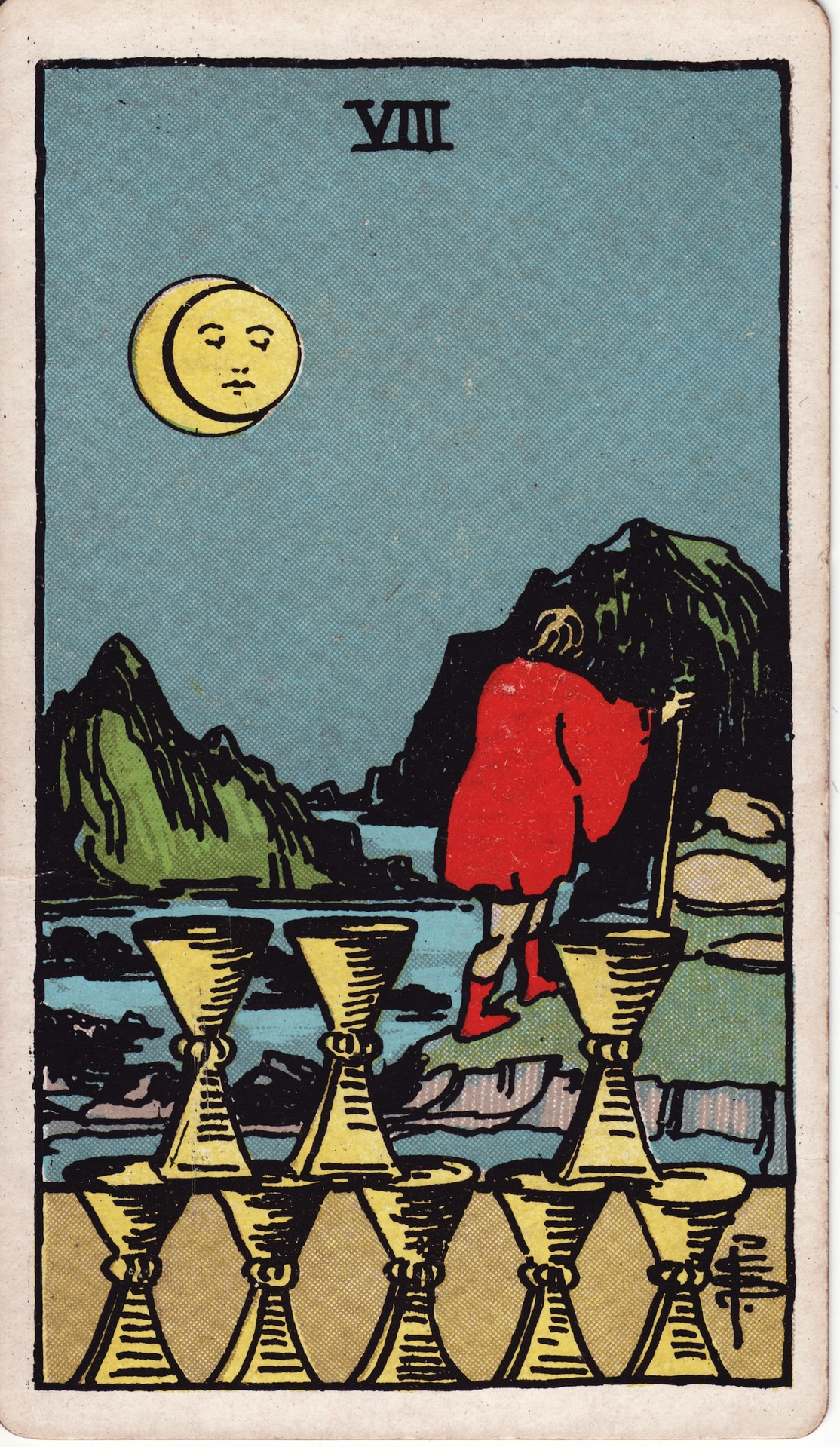
Eight of Cups

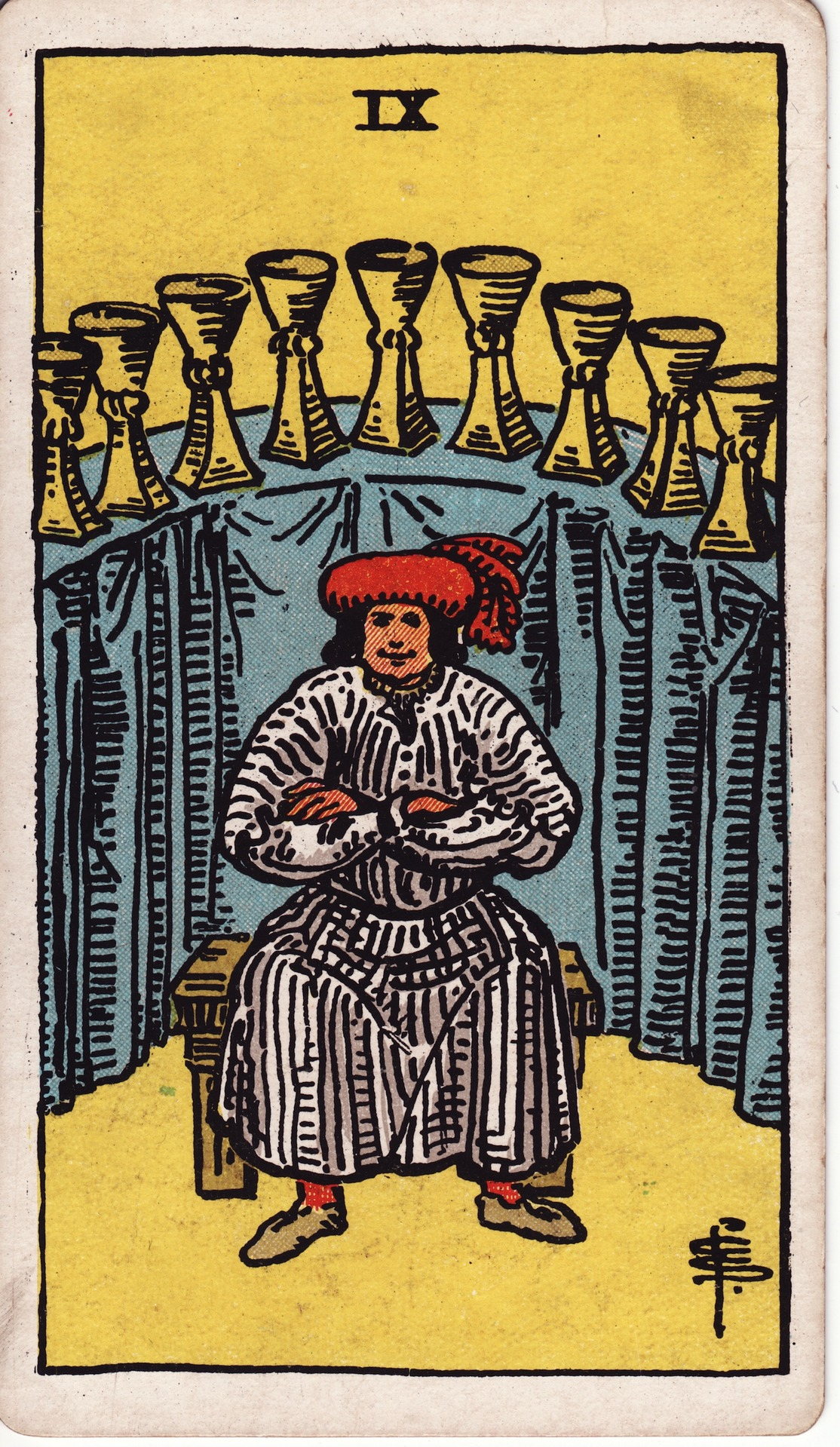
Nine of Cups

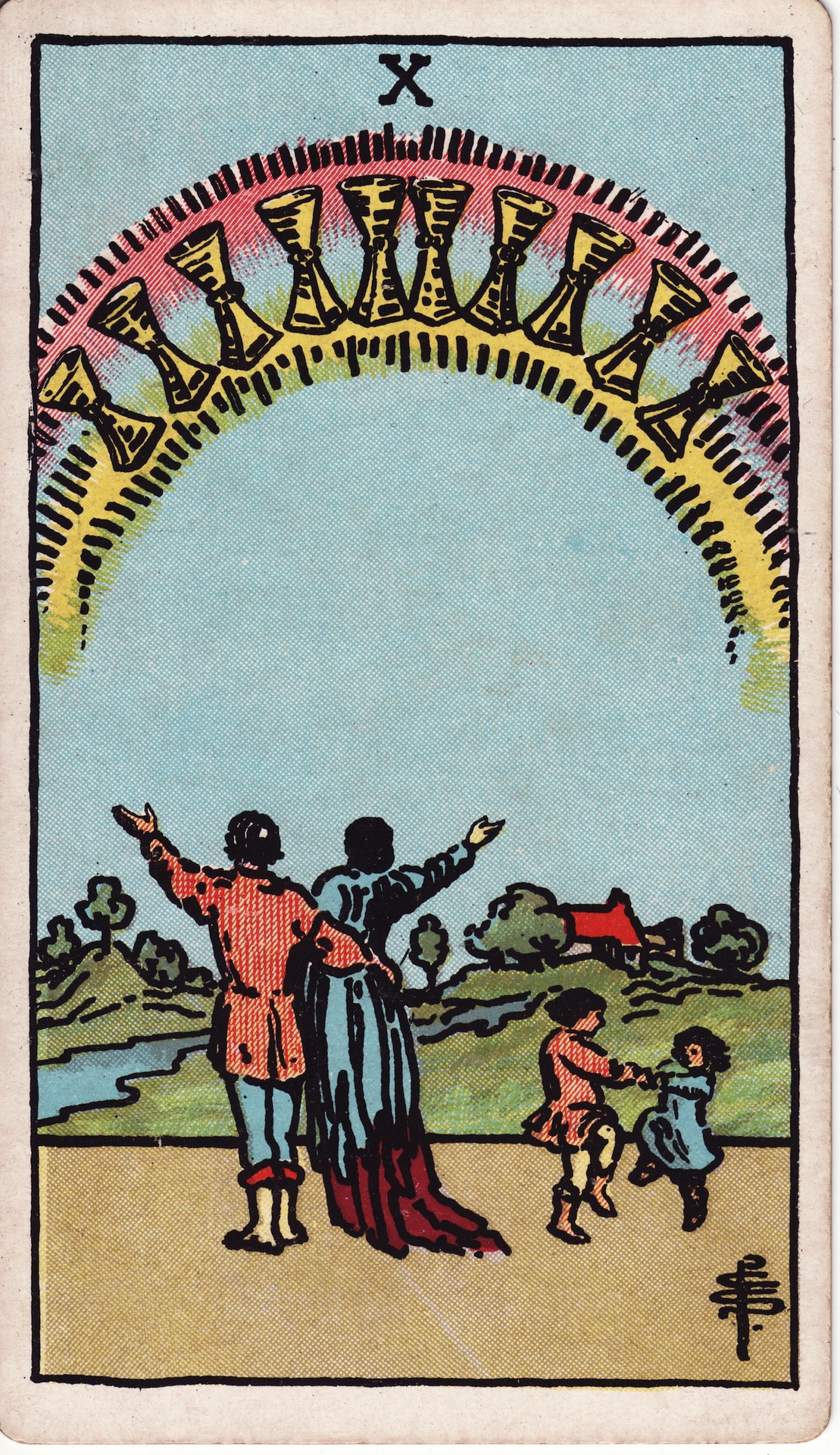
Ten of Cups

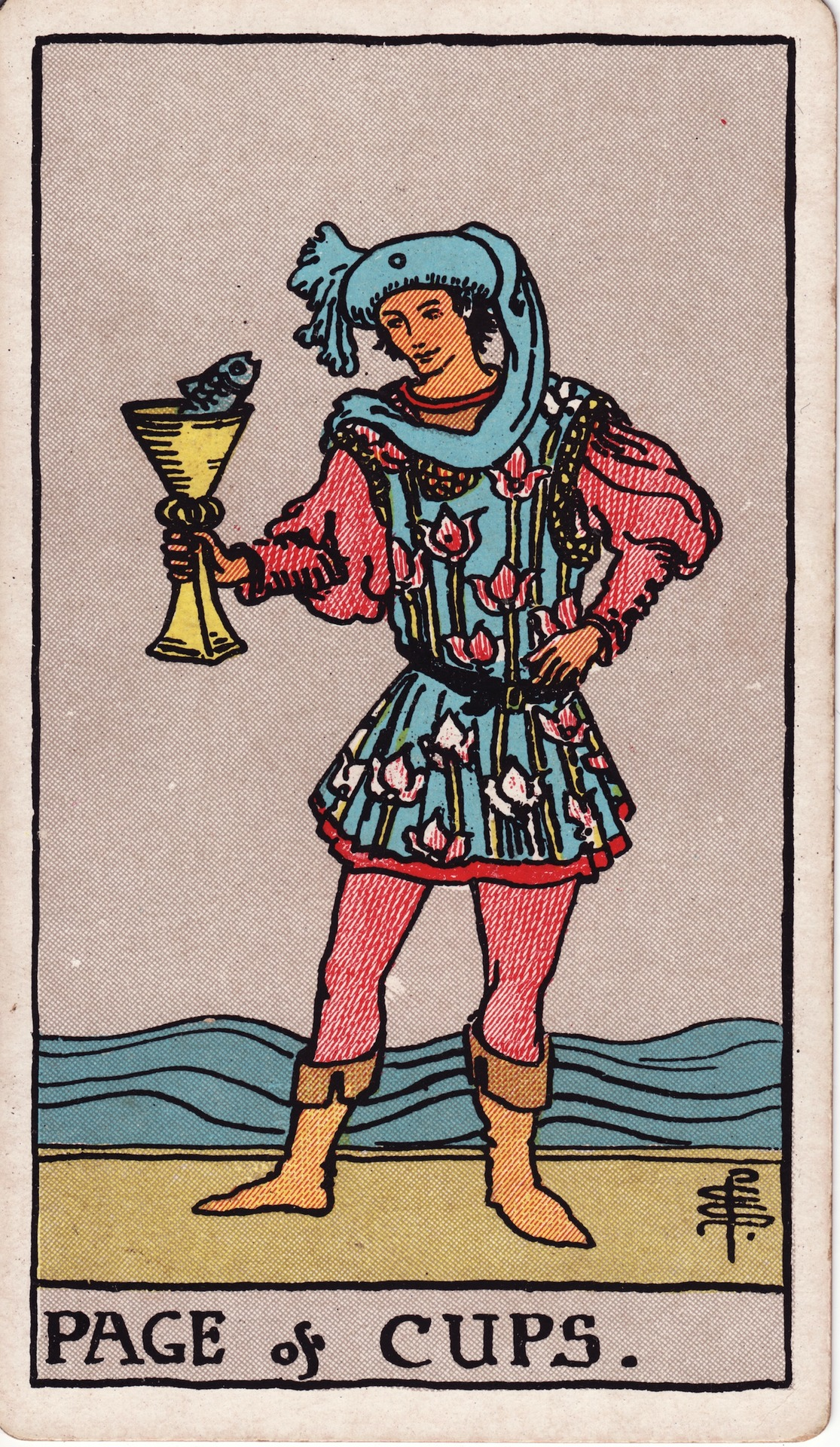
Page of Cups

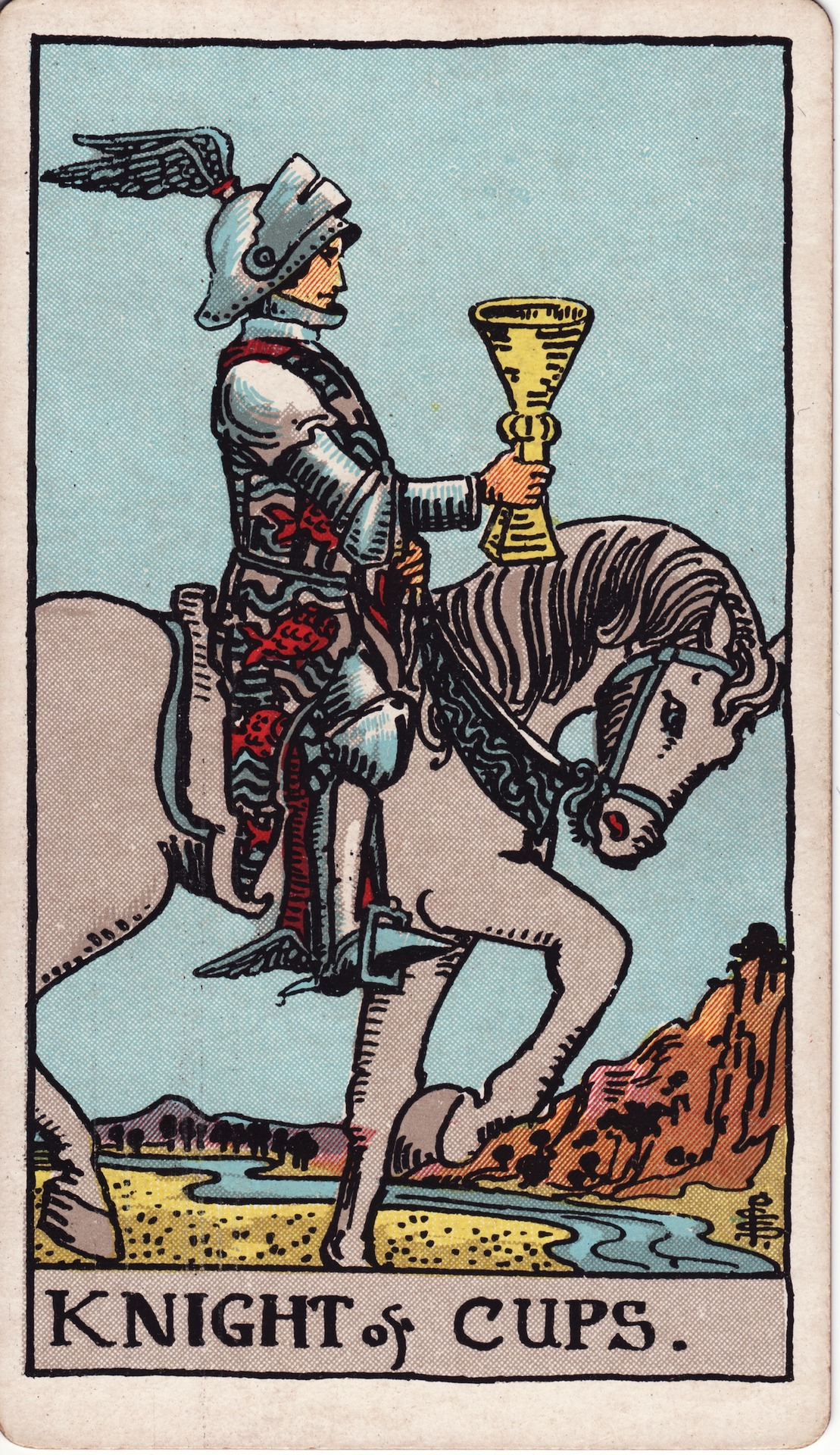
Knight of Cups

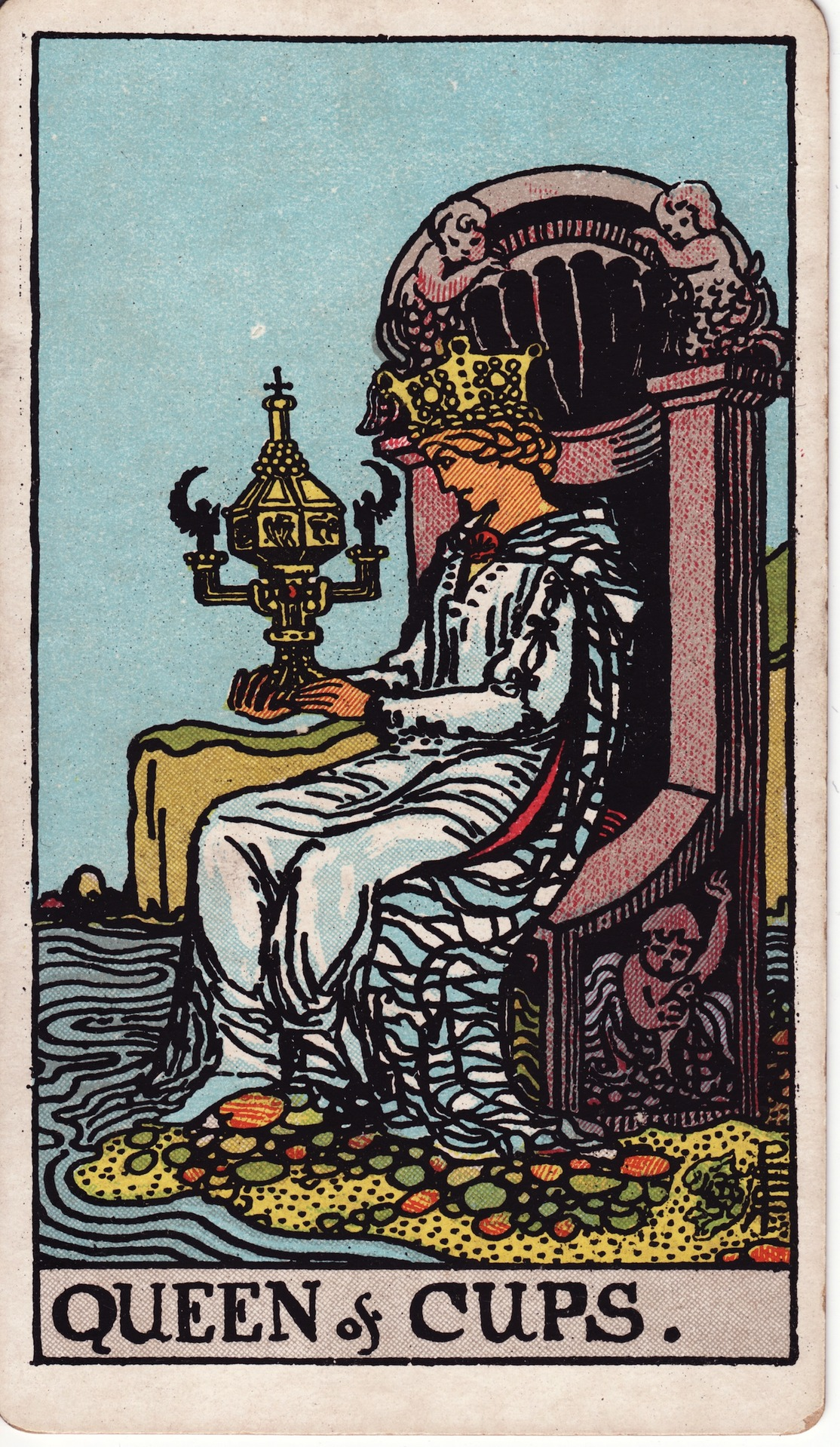
Queen of Cups

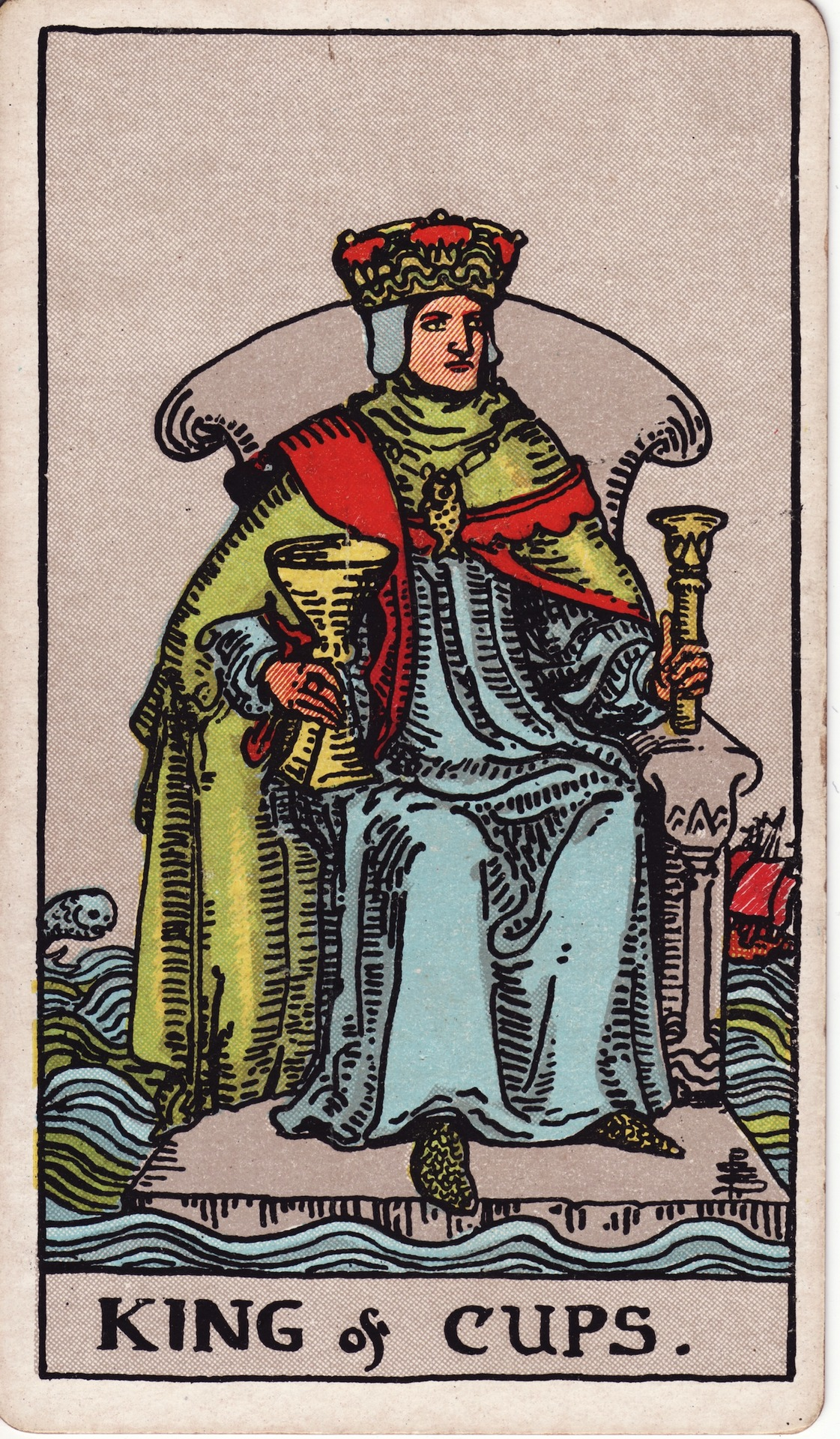
King of Cups

=== Swords ===
The suit of swords, corresponding to the spades of modern playing cards:

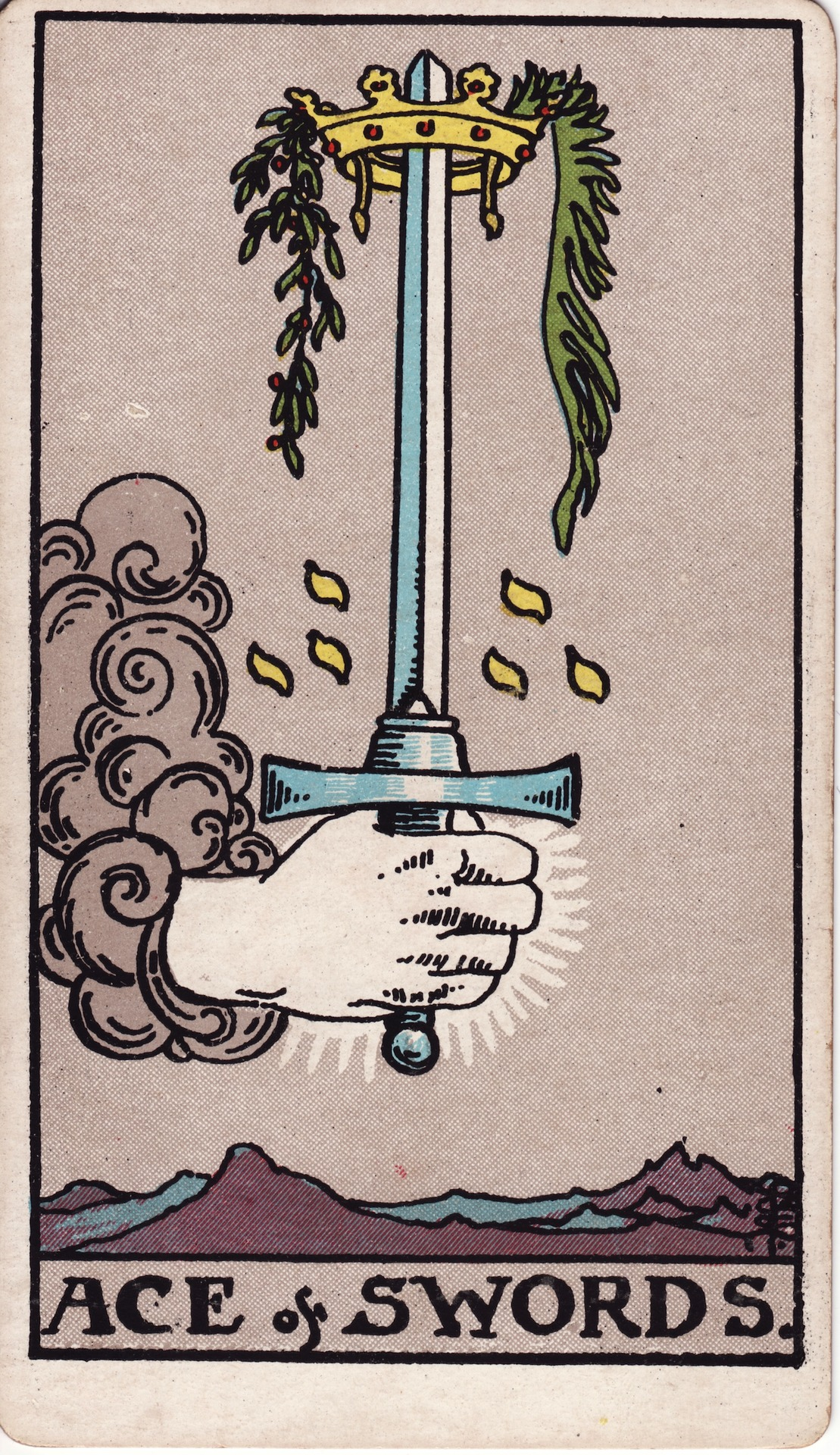
Ace of Swords

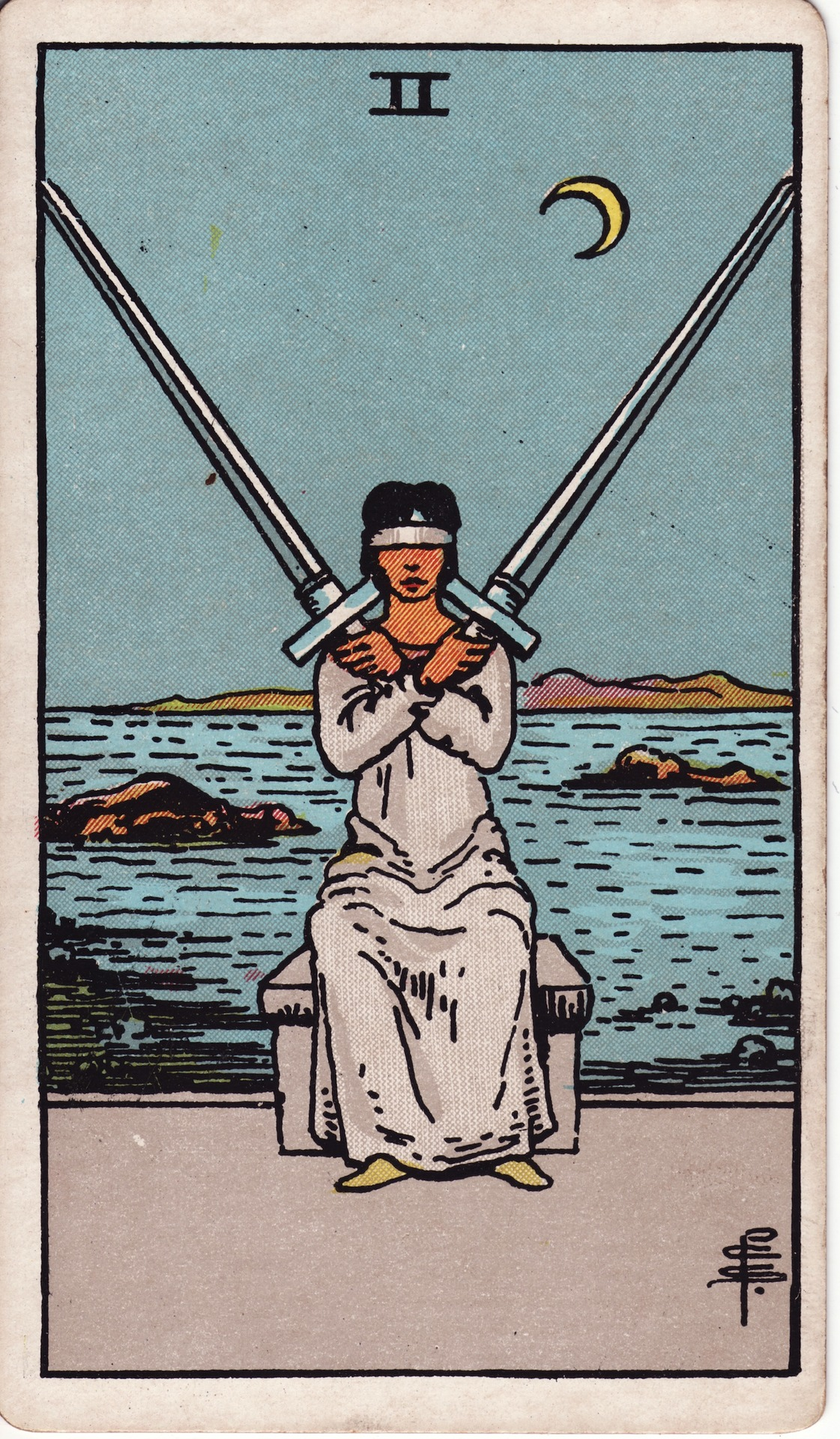
Two of Swords

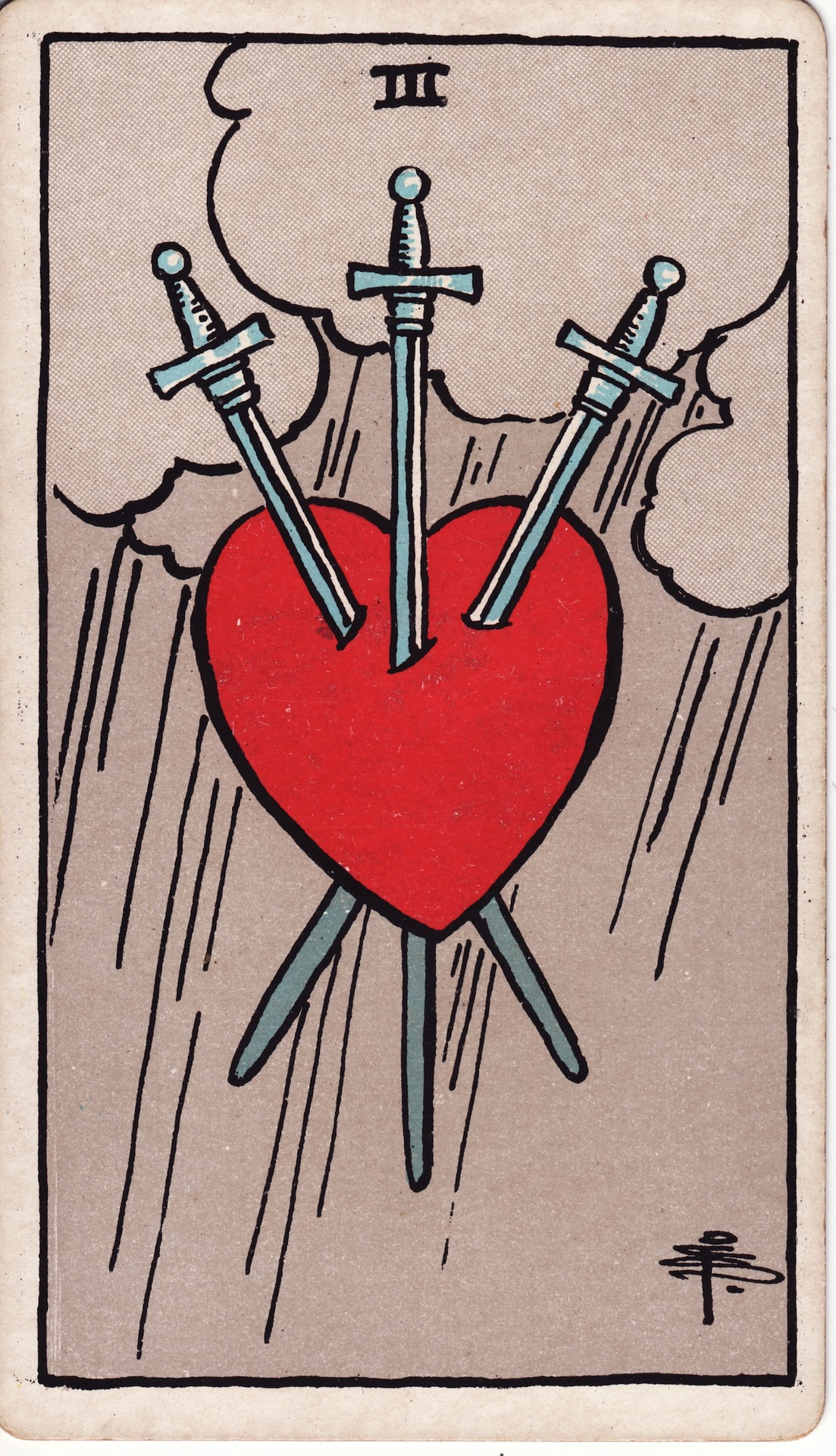
Three of Swords

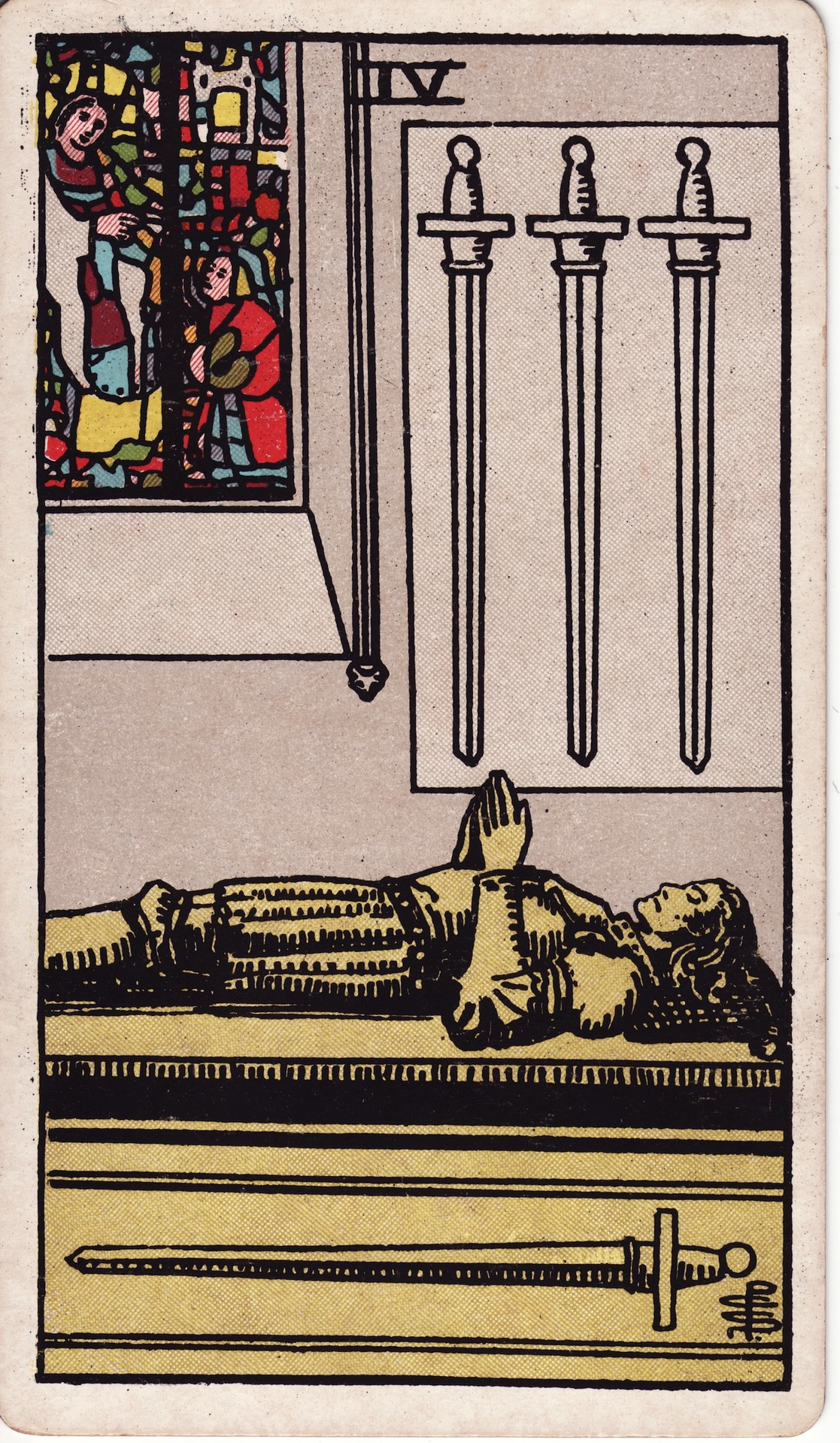
Four of Swords

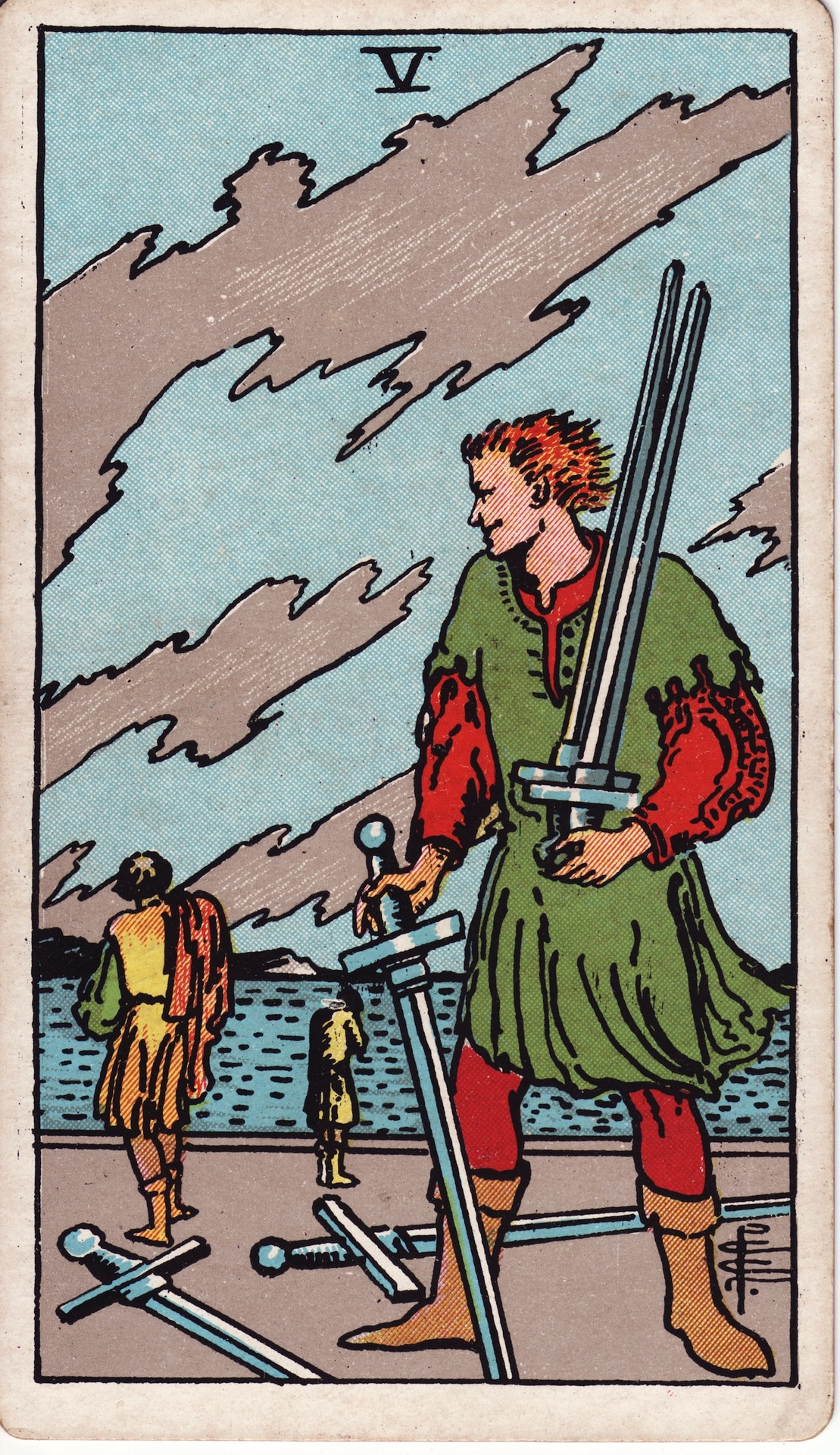
Five of Swords

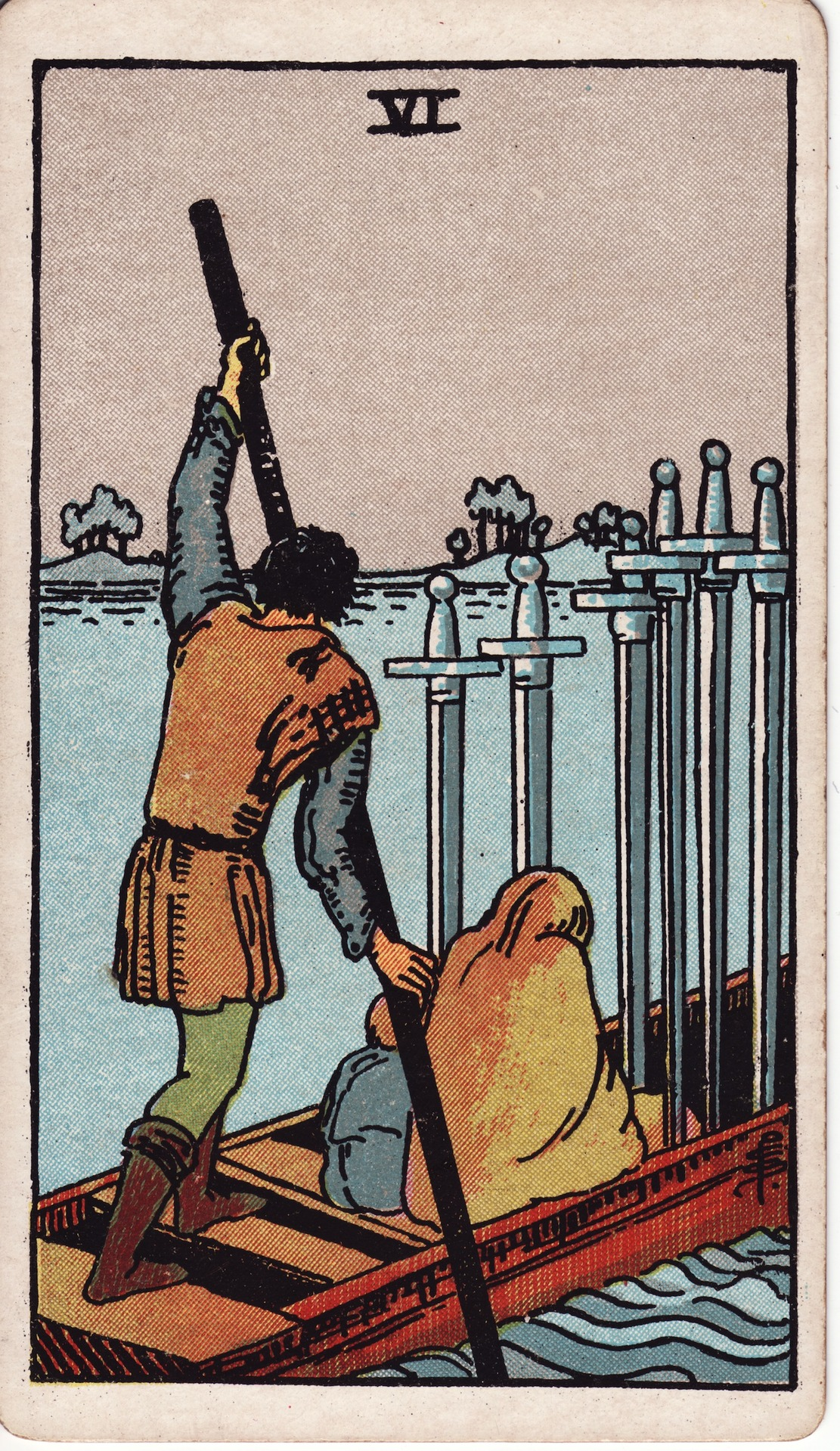
Six of Swords

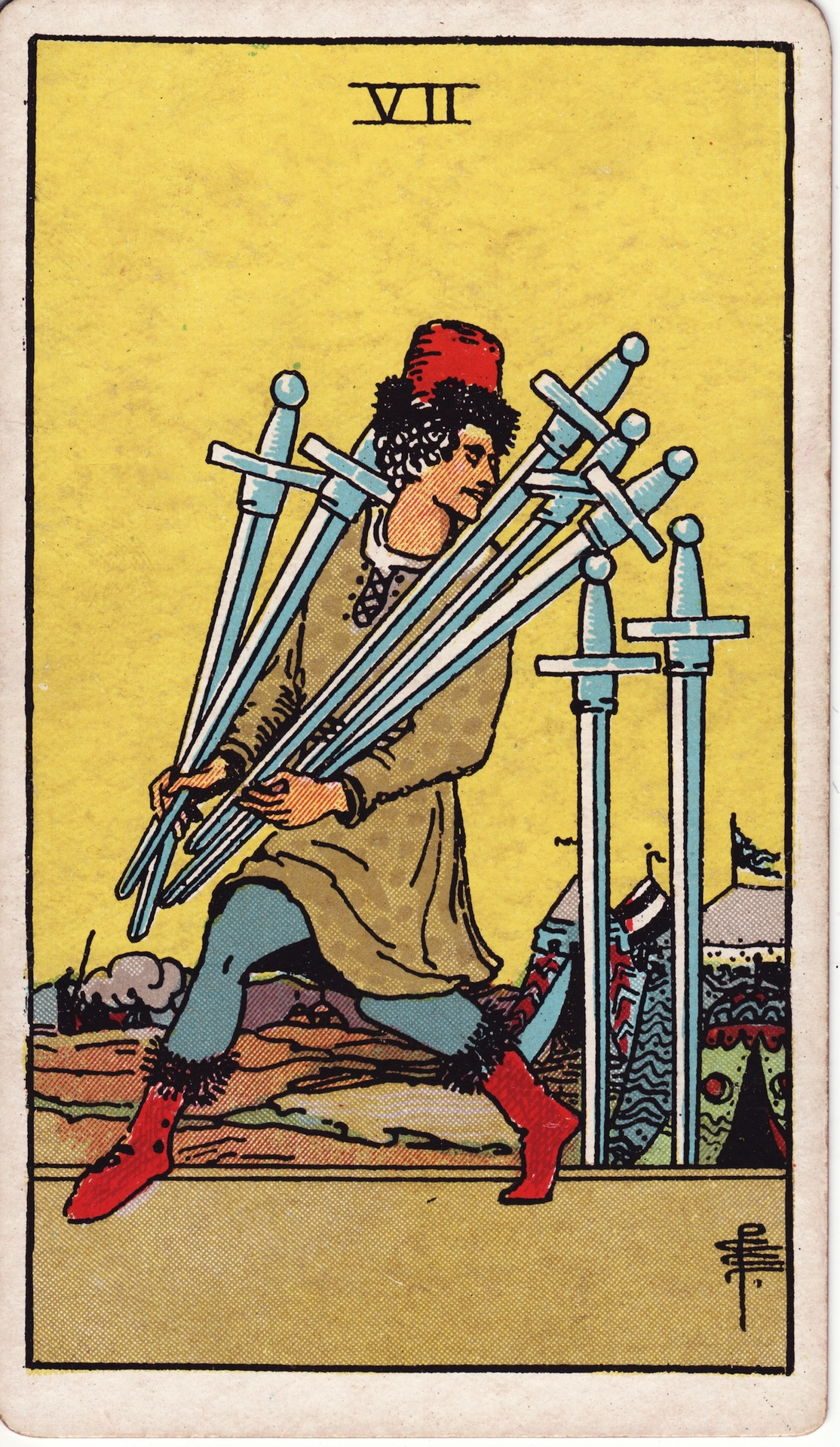
Seven of Swords

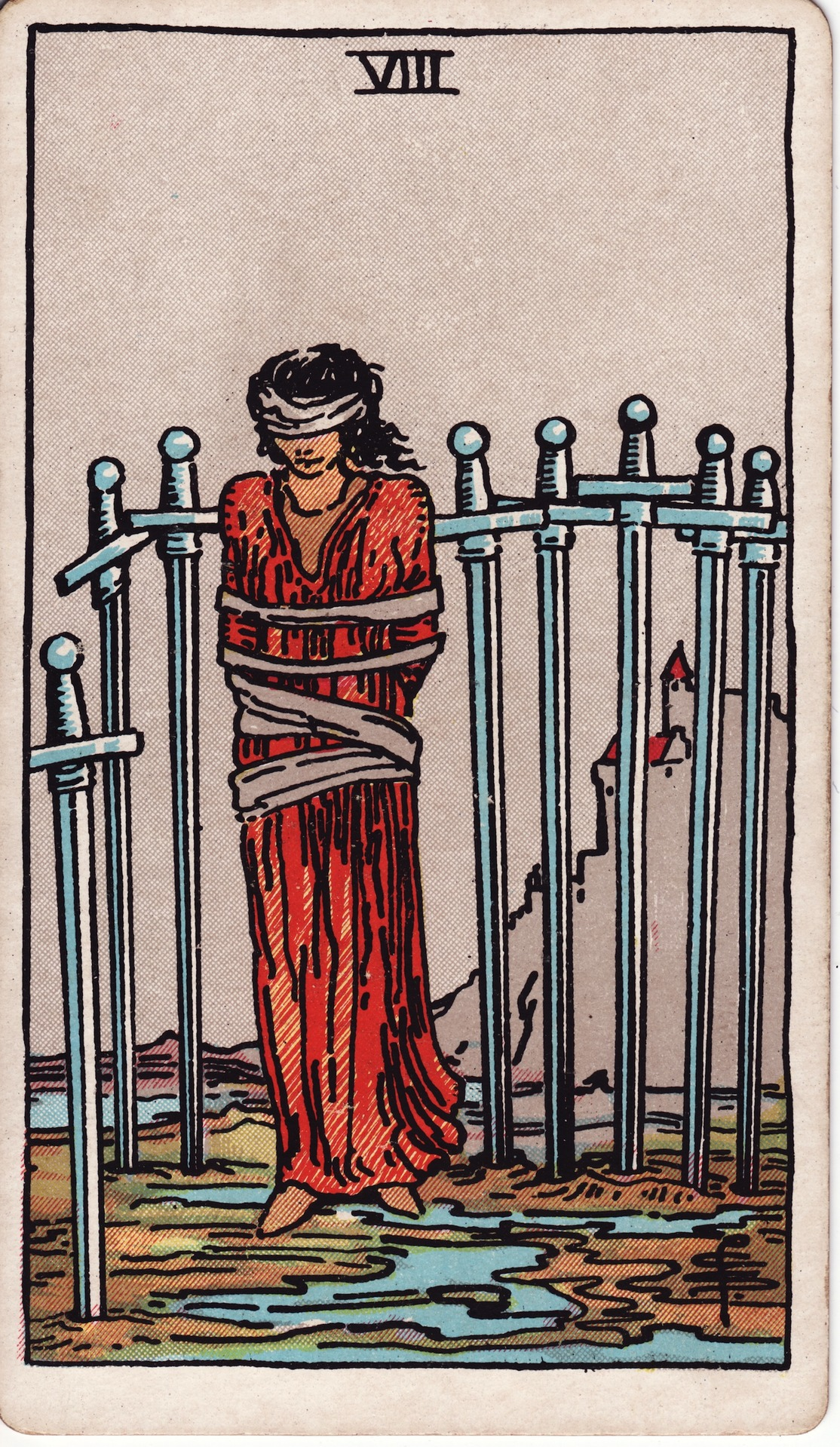
Eight of Swords

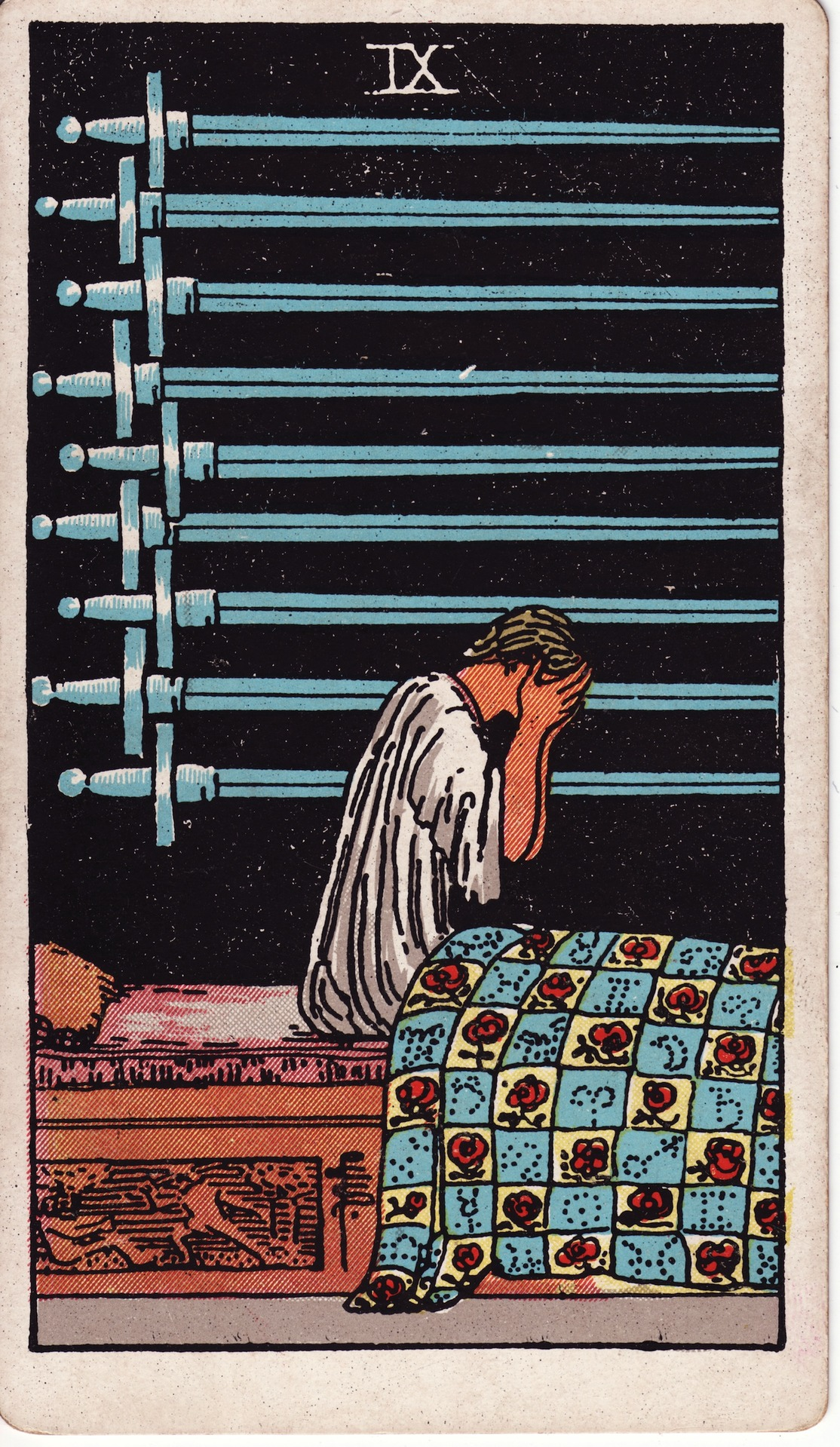
Nine of Swords

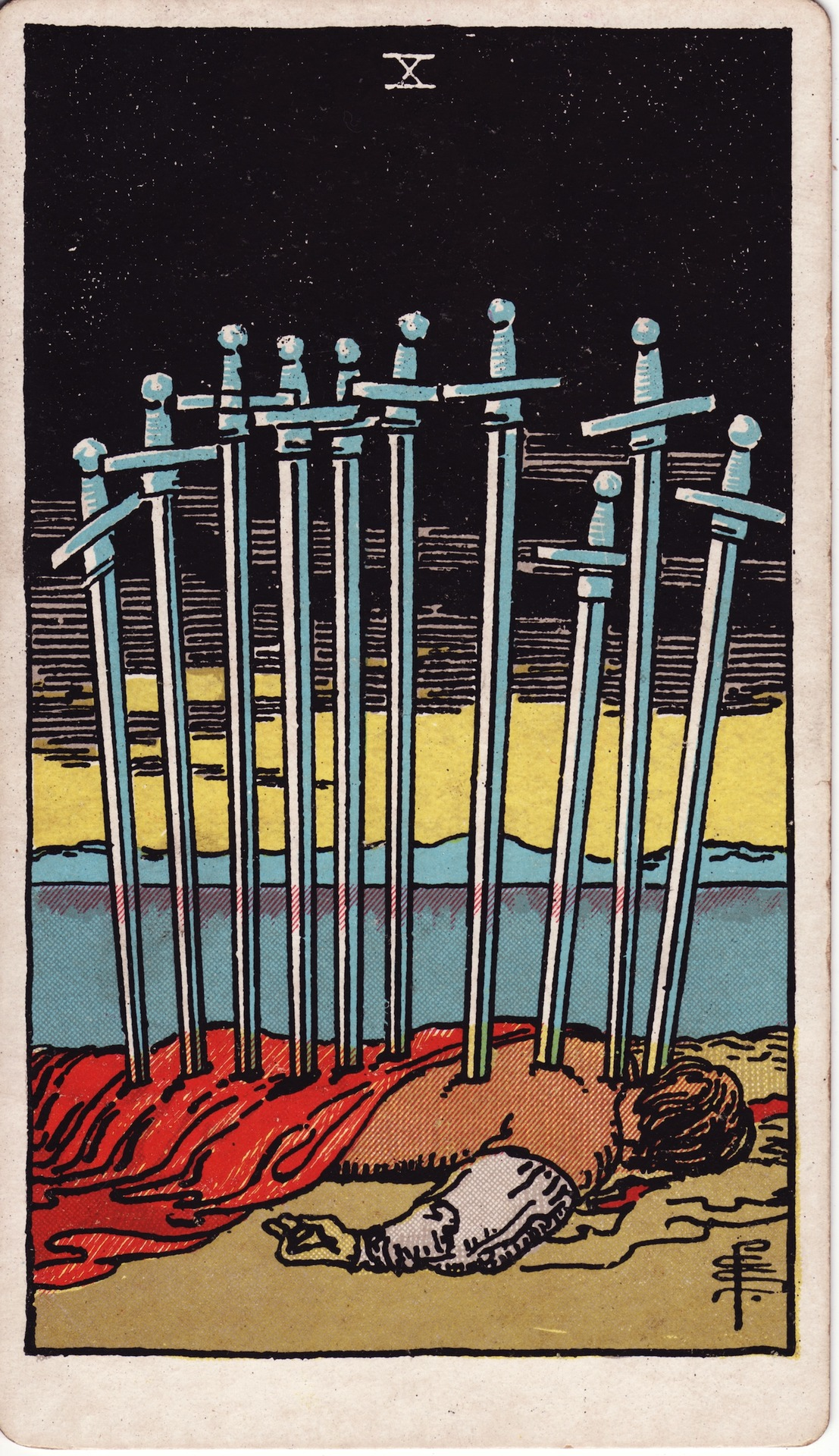
Ten of Swords

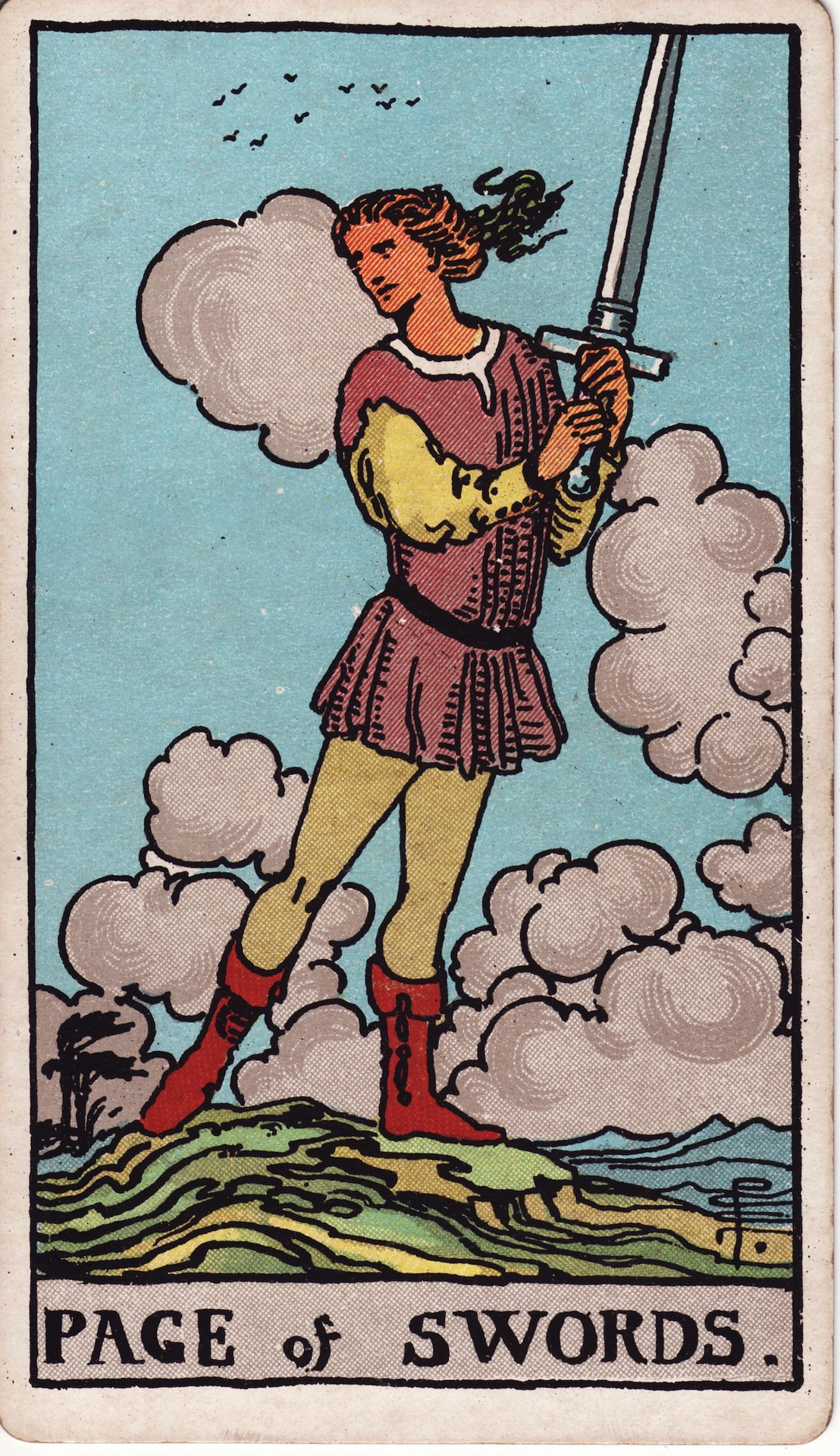
Page of Swords

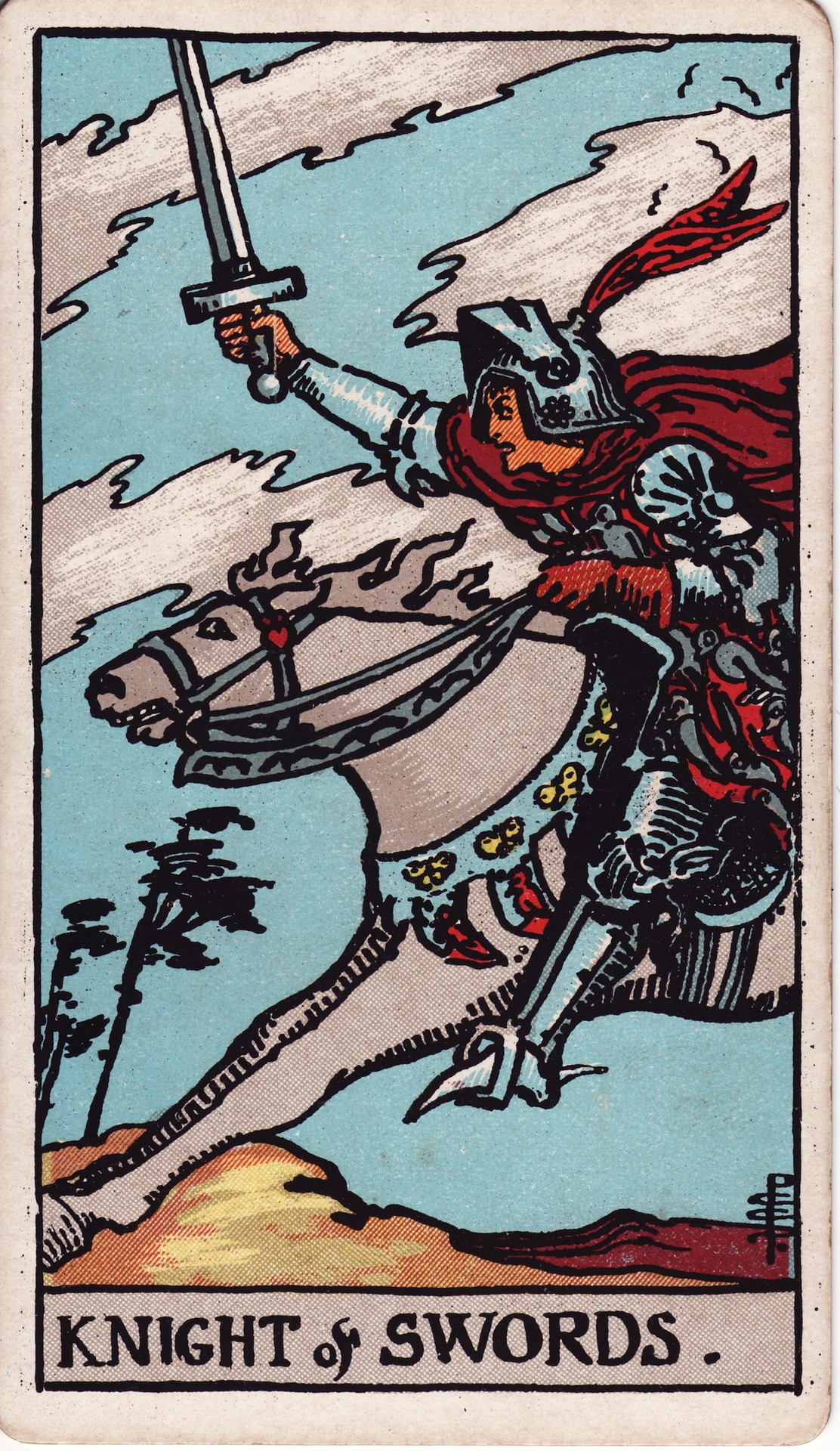
Knight of Swords

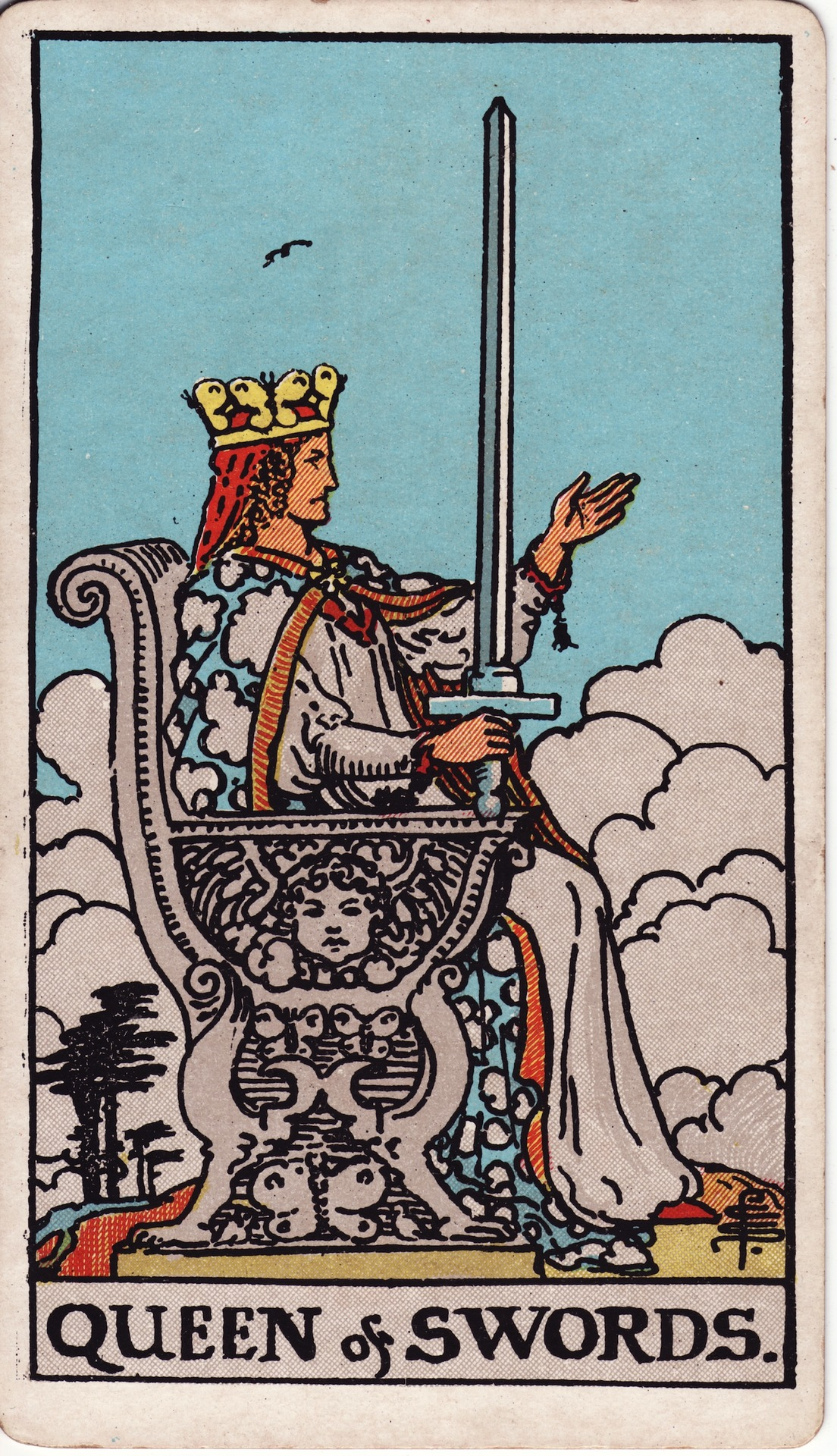
Queen of Swords

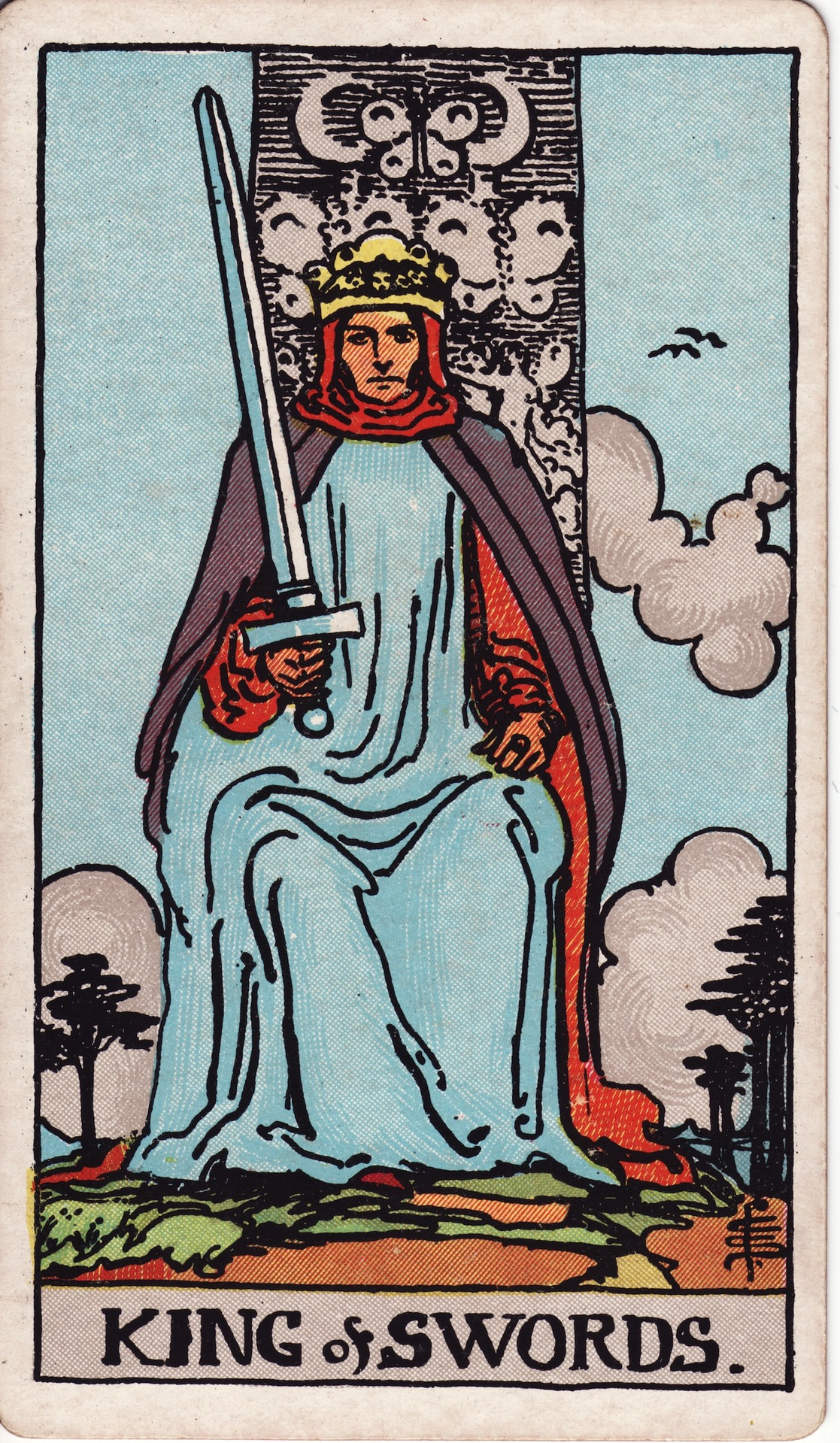
King of Swords

=== Pentacles ===
The suit of pentacles or coins, corresponding to the diamonds of modern playing cards:

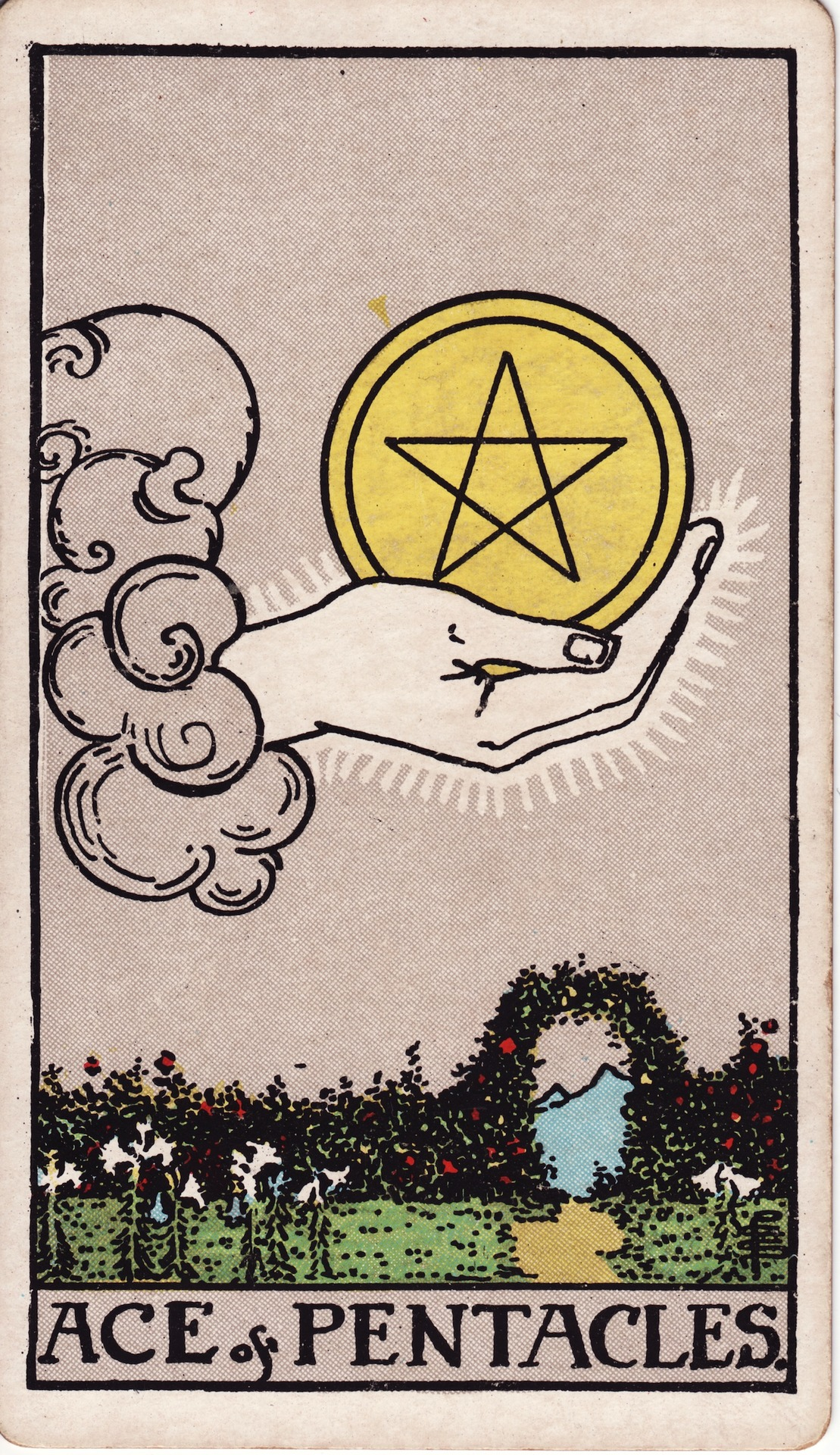
Ace of Pentacles

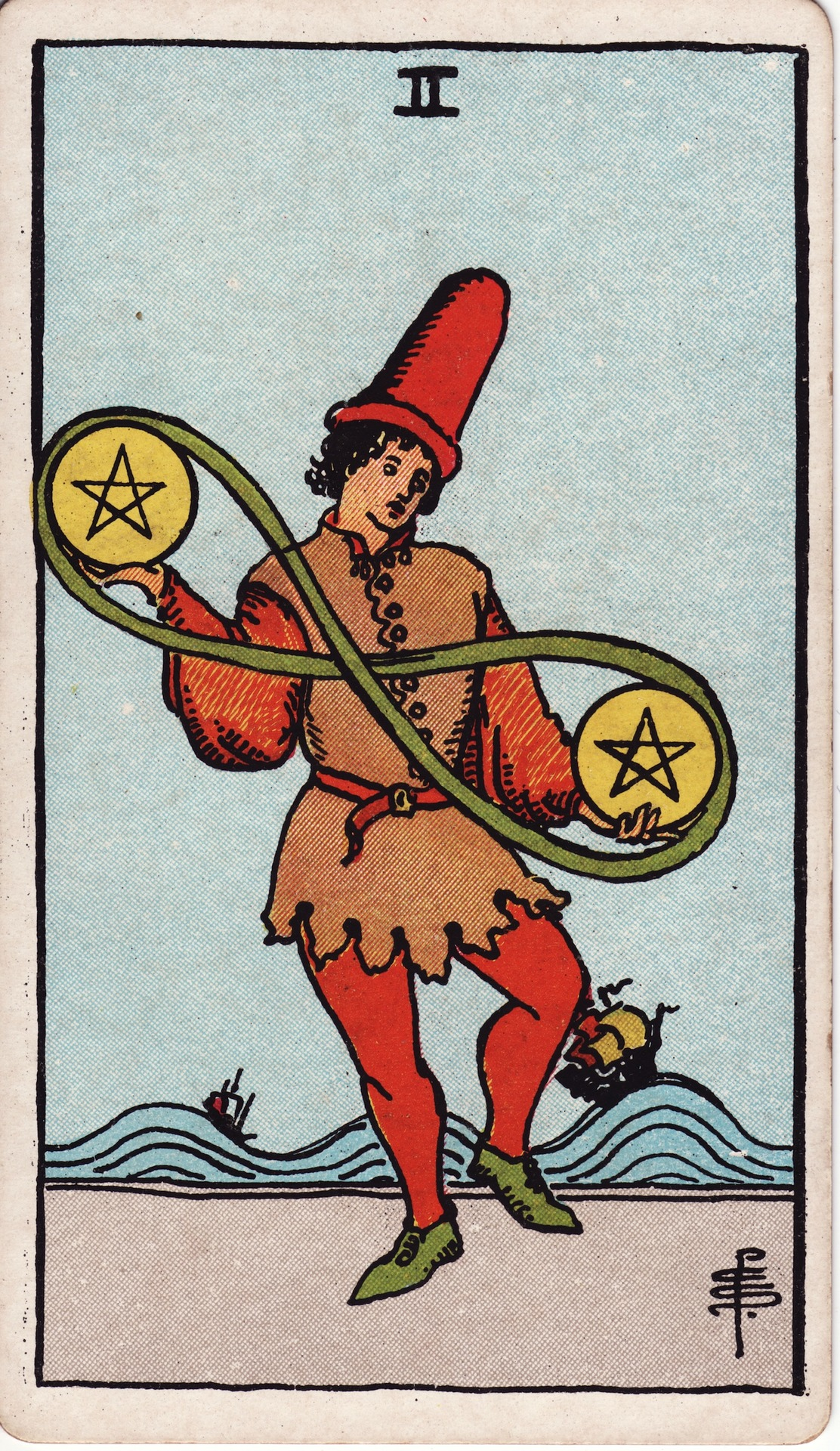
Two of Pentacles

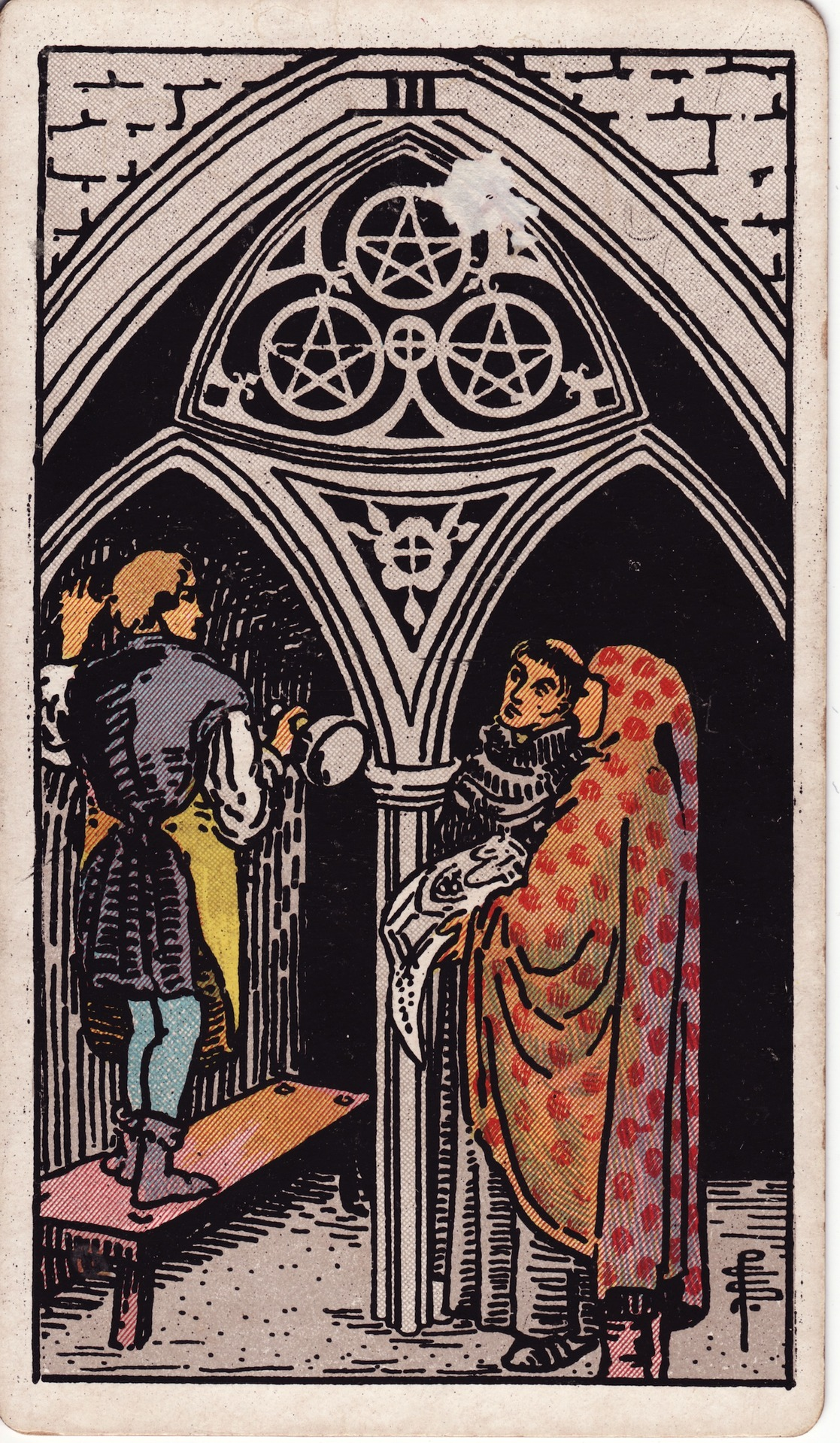
Three of Pentacles

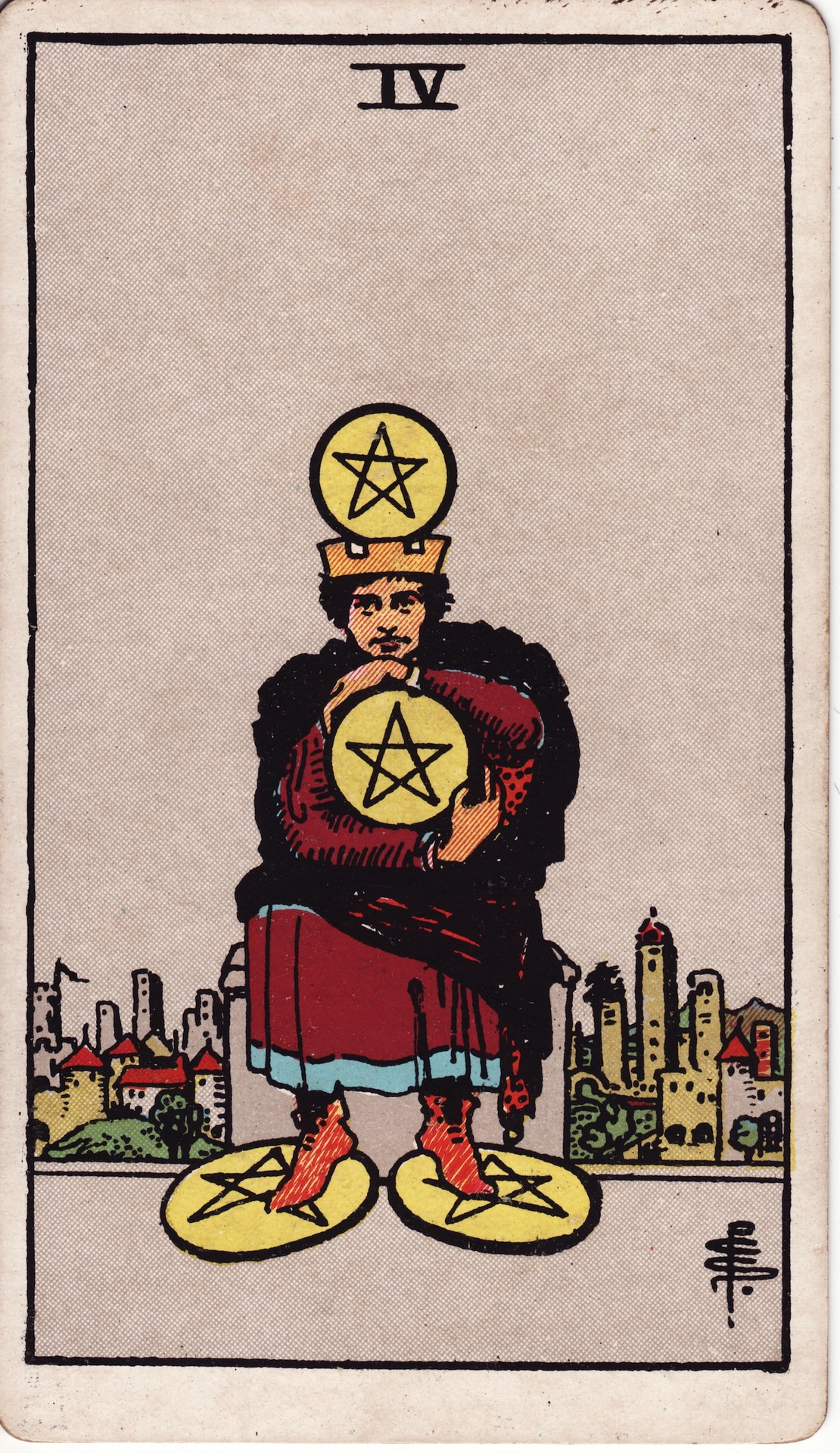
Four of Pentacles

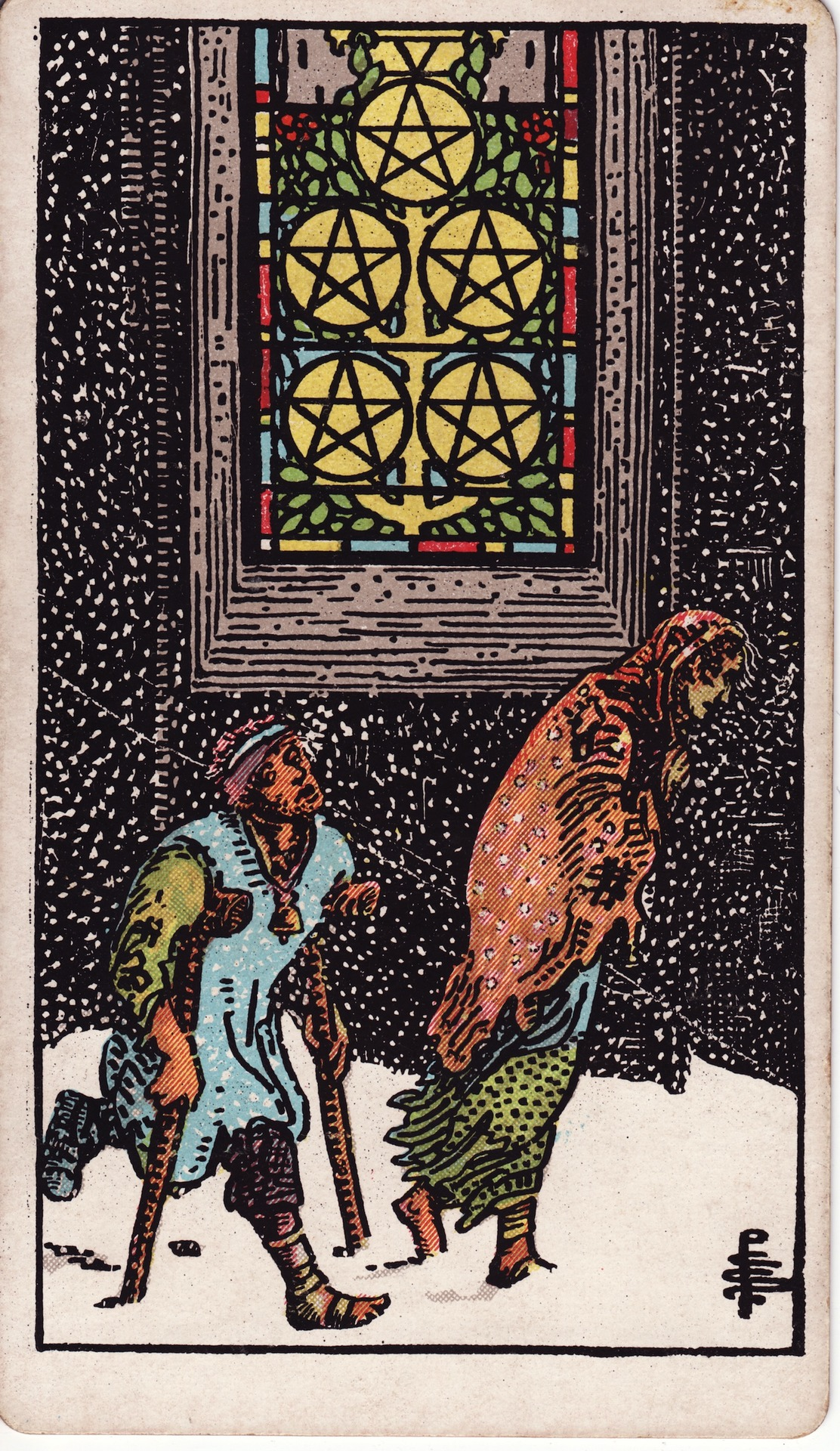
Five of Pentacles

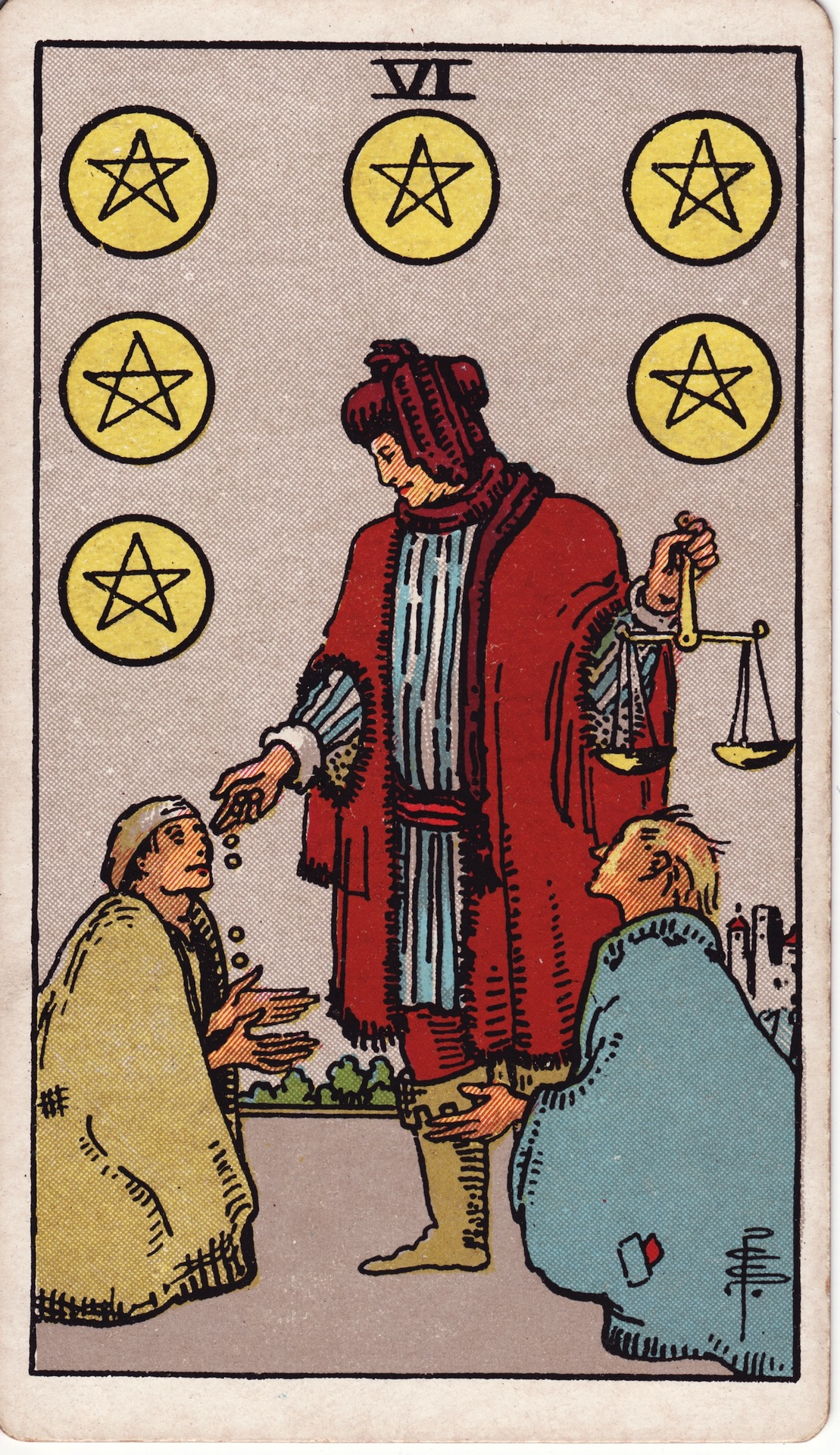
Six of Pentacles

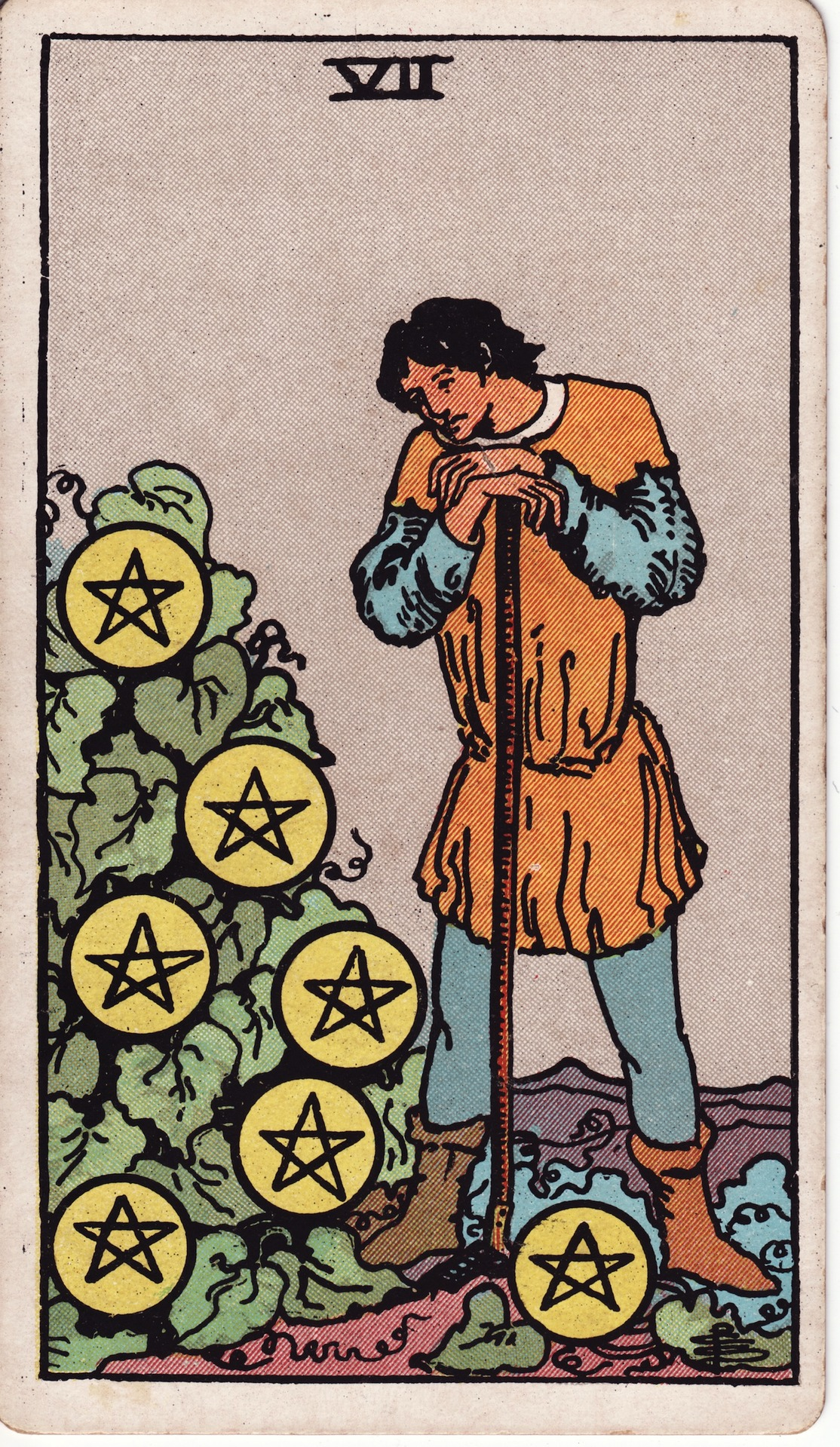
Seven of Pentacles

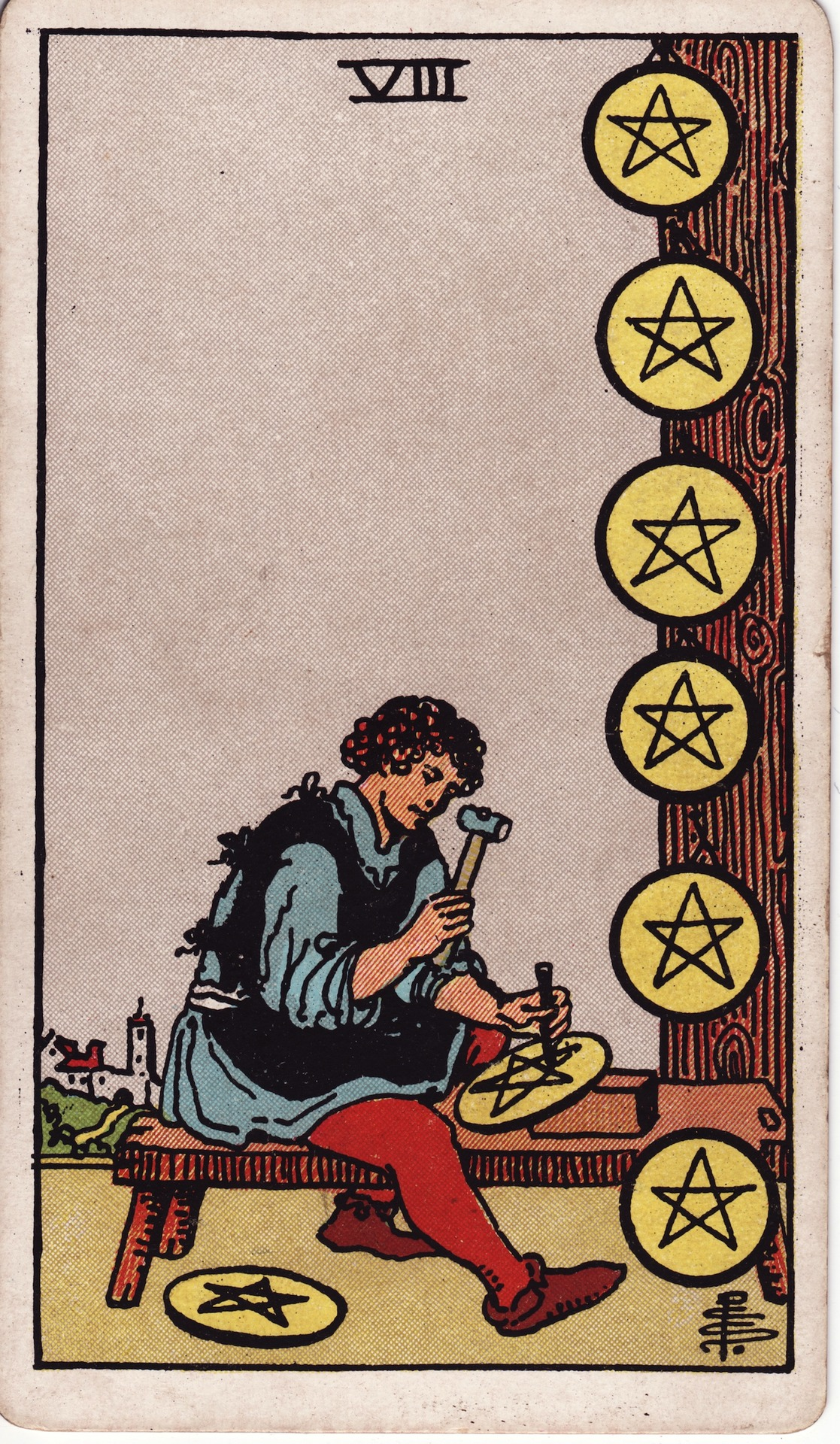
Eight of Pentacles

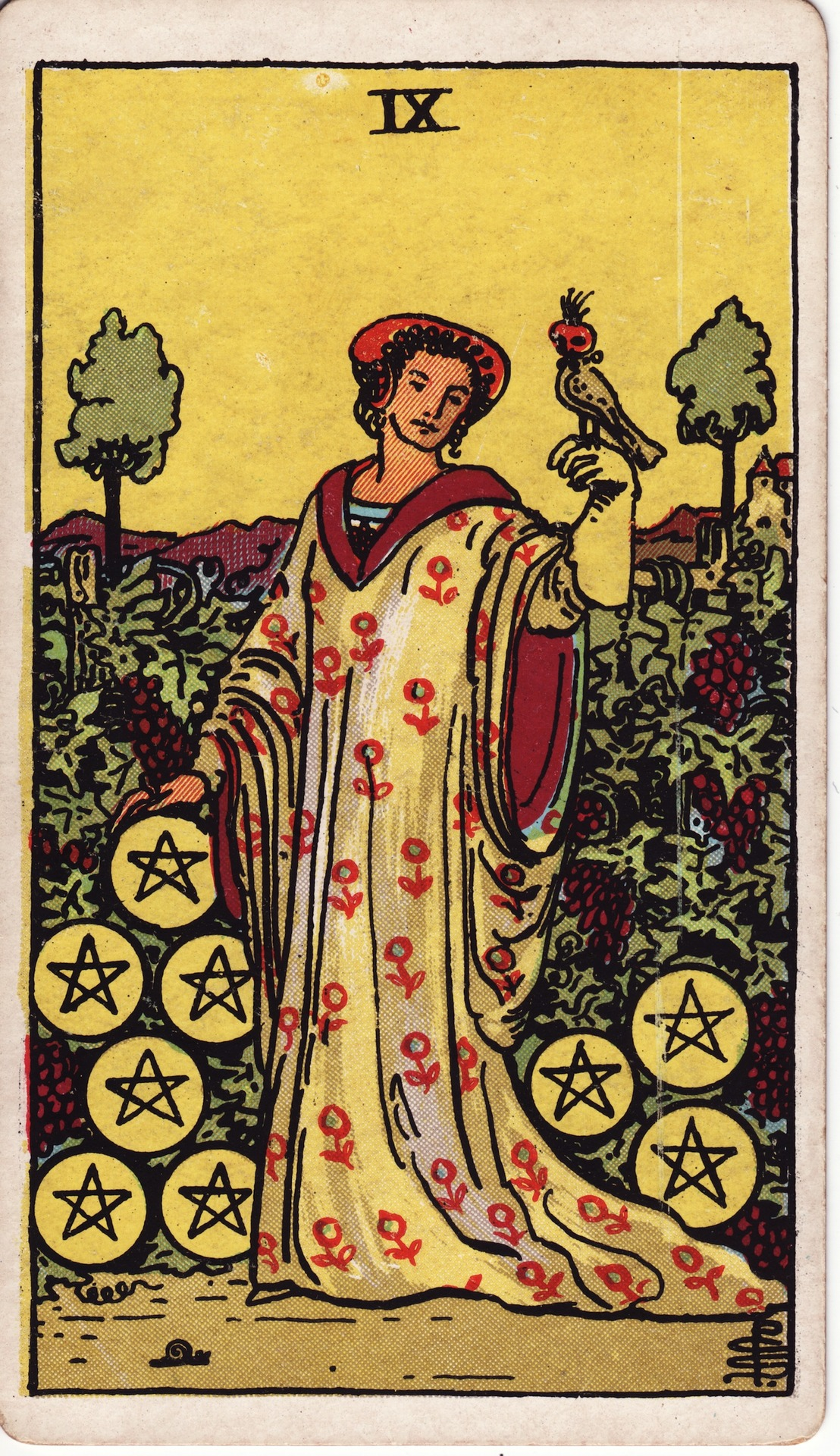
Nine of Pentacles

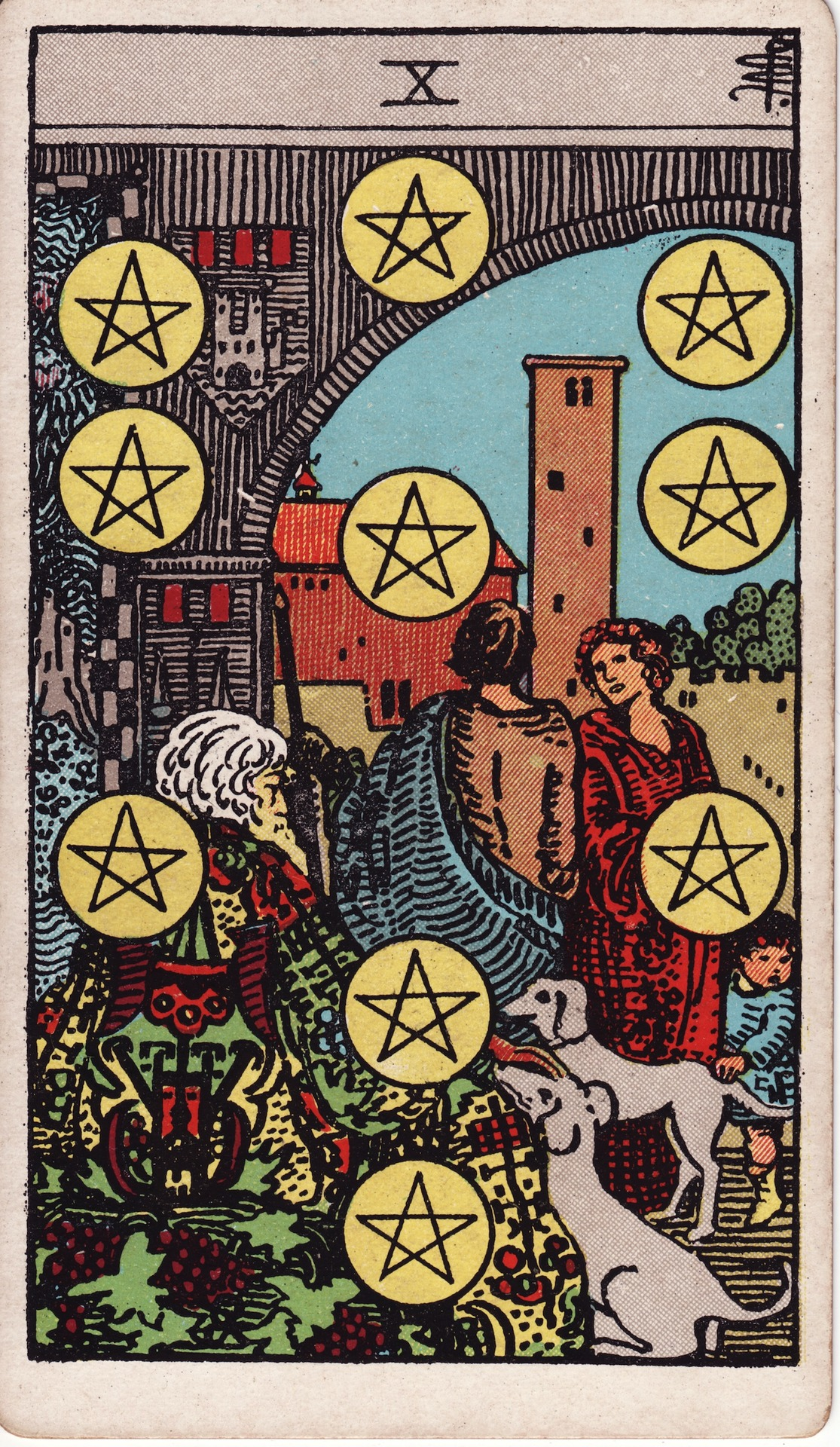
Ten of Pentacles

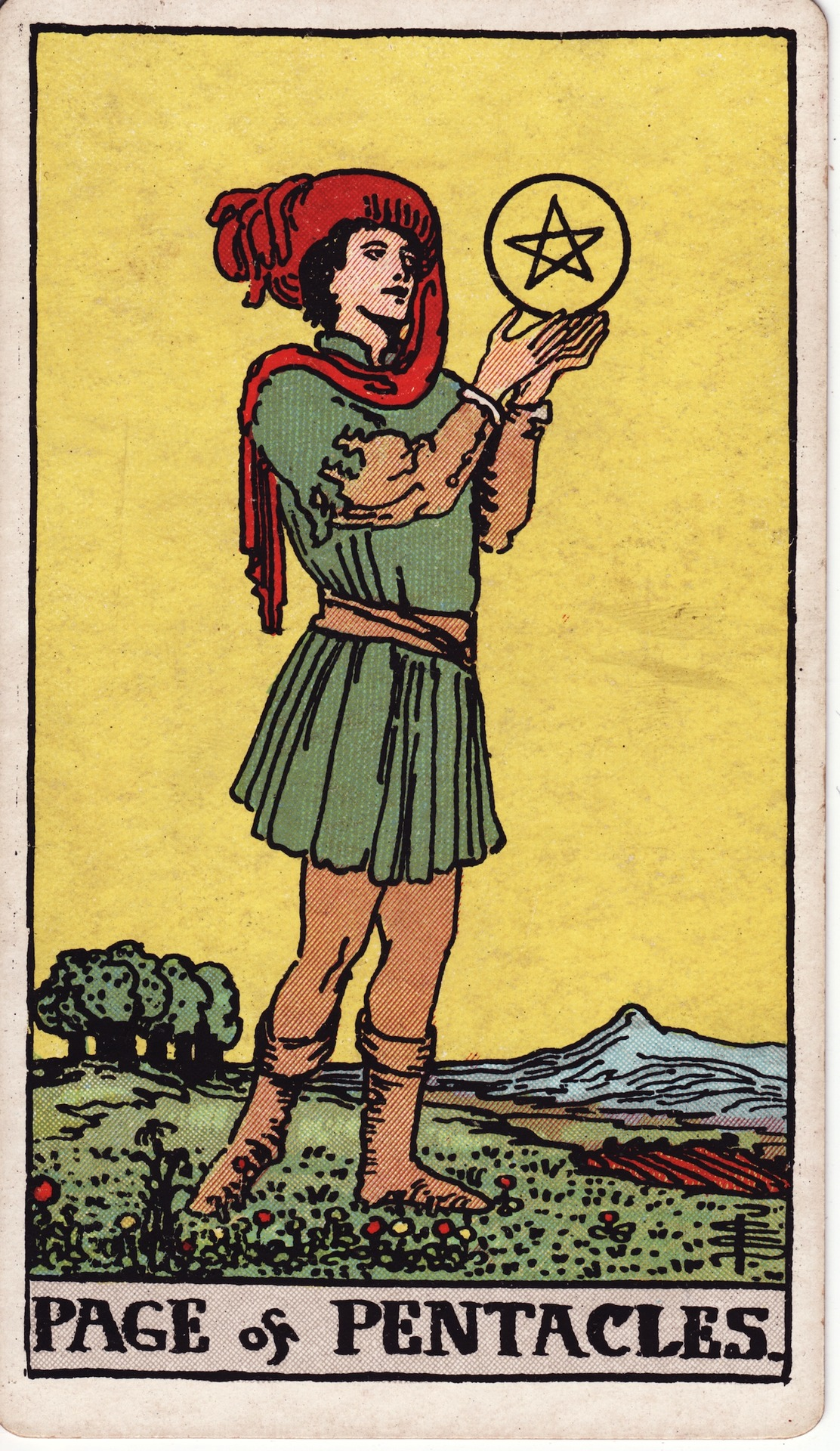
Page of Pentacles

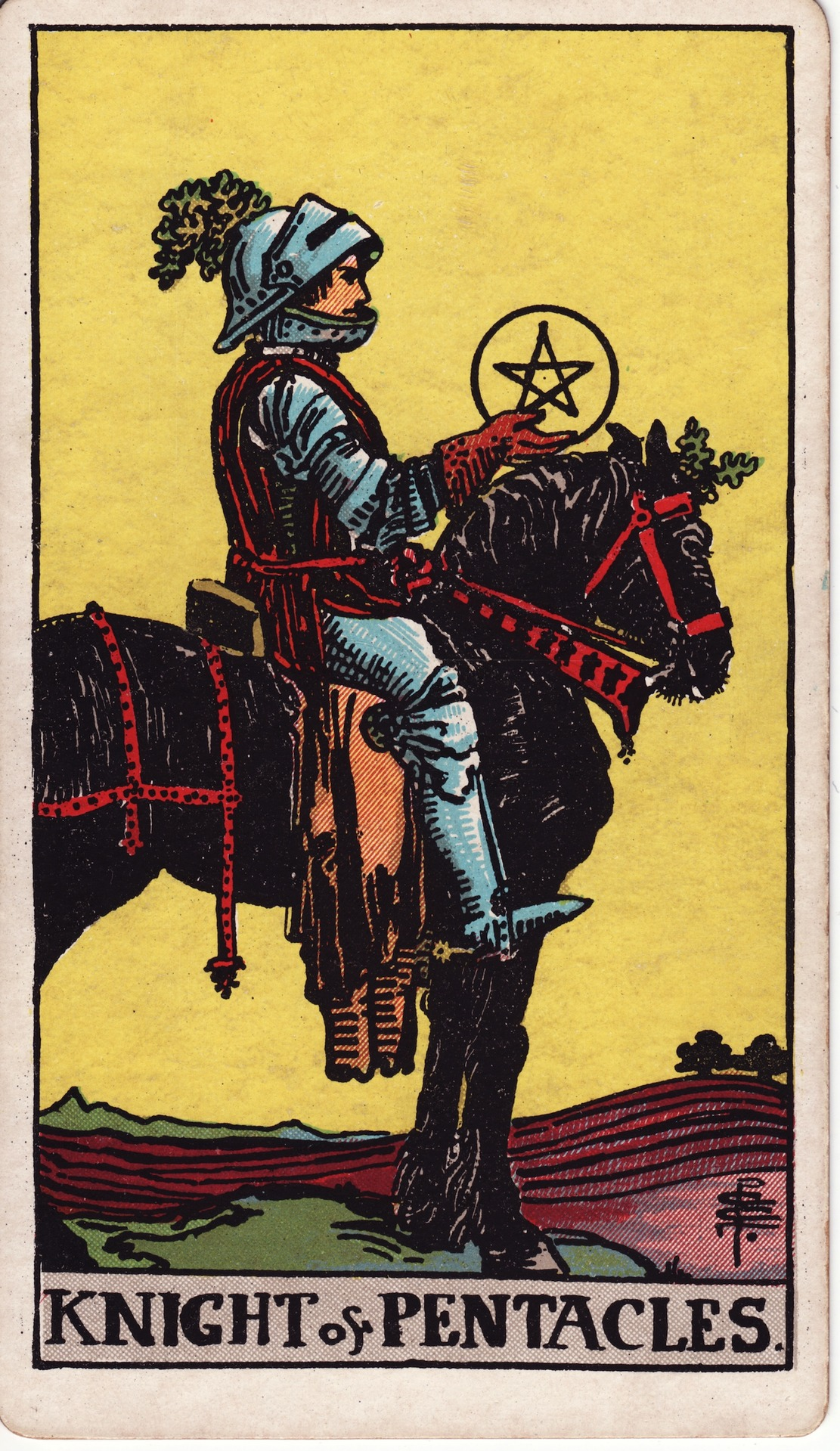
Knight of Pentacles

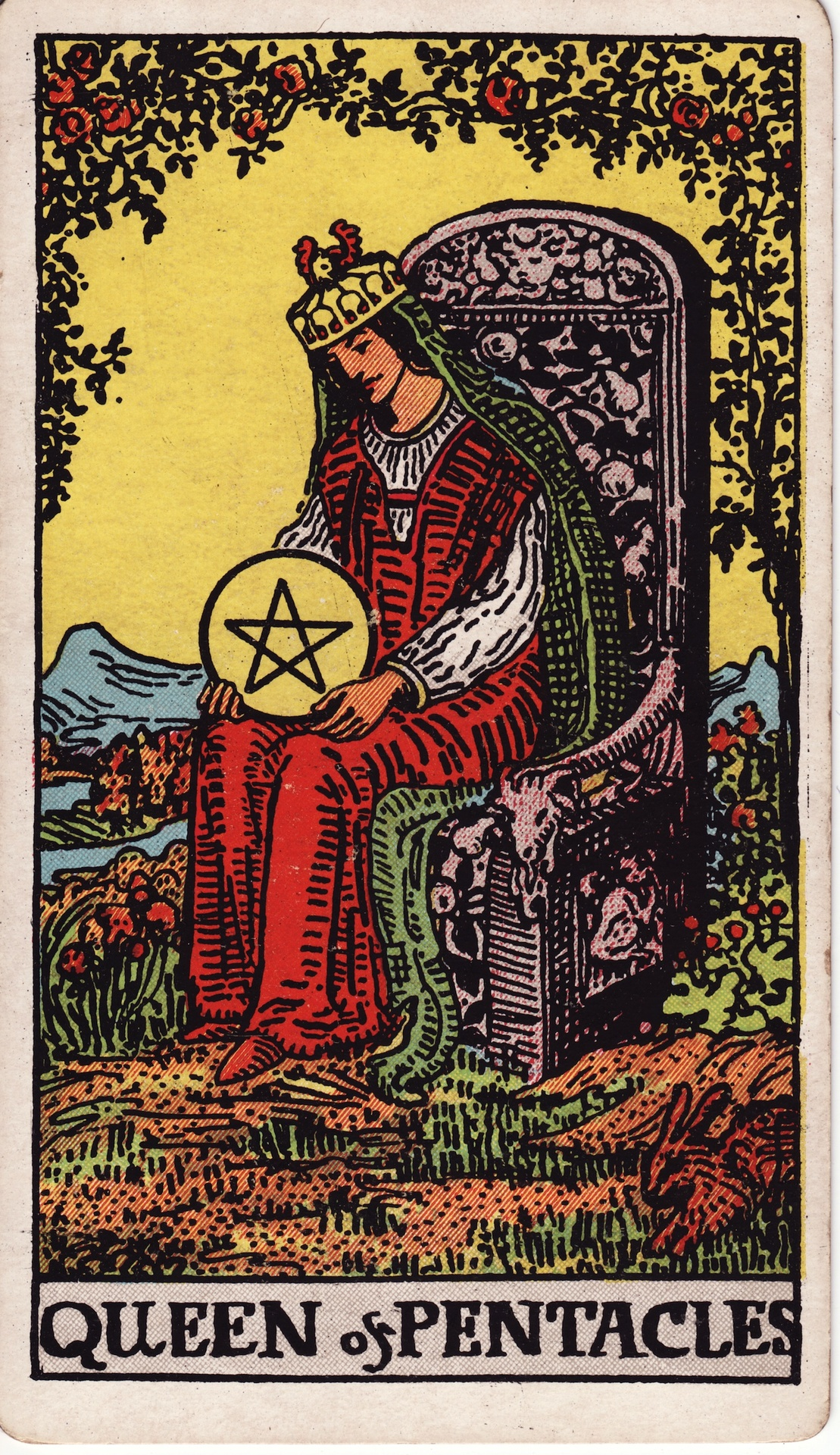
Queen of Pentacles

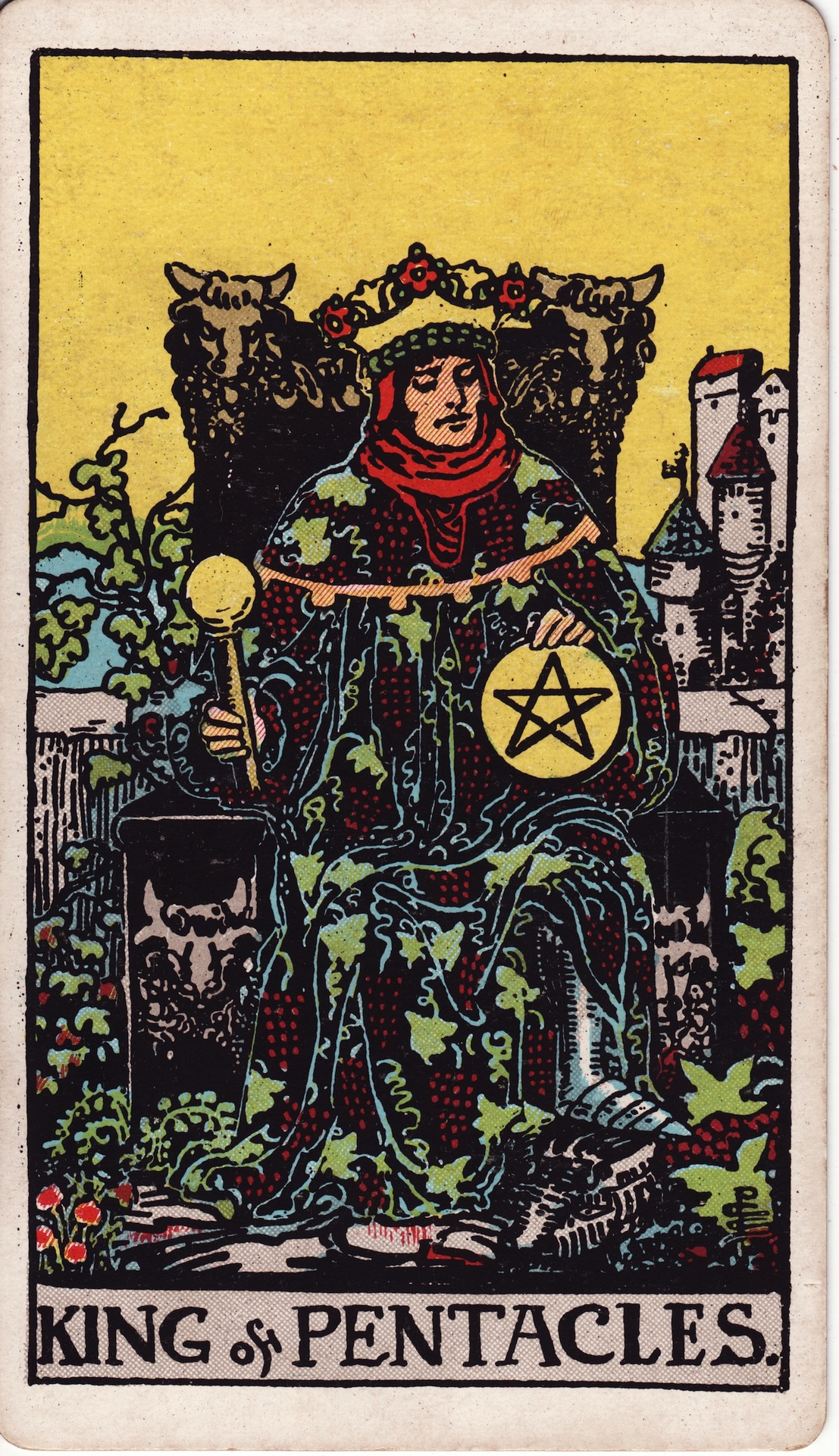
King of Pentacles

== Publication ==
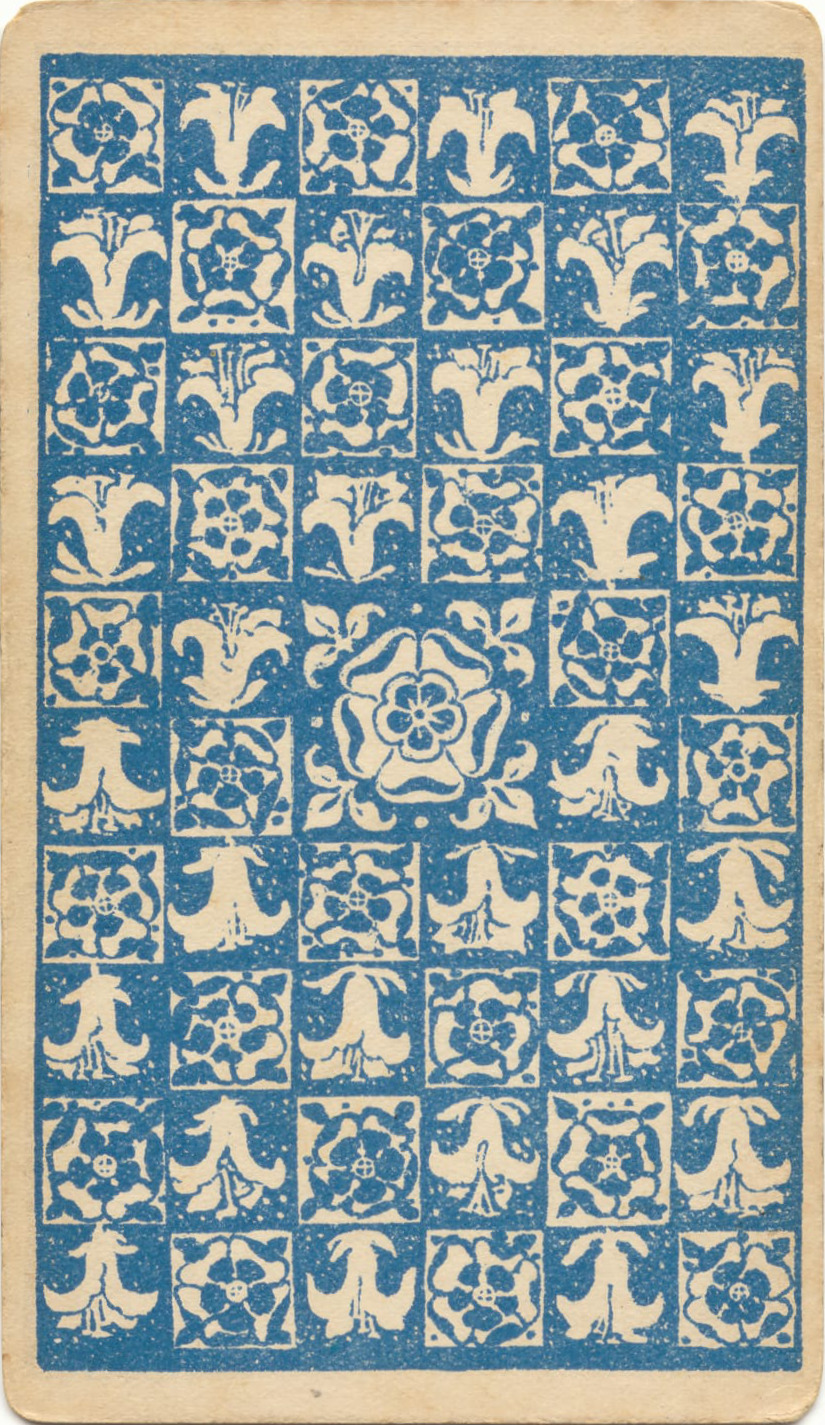
The original 1909 roses and lilies card back design

The cards were first published in December 1909, by the publisher William Rider & Son of London. The first printing was extremely limited and featured card backs with a roses and lilies pattern. In March 1910, a much larger printing featured better quality card stock and a "cracked mud" card back design. This edition, often referred to as the "A" deck, was published from 1910 to 1920. Rider continued publishing the deck in various editions until 1939, then again from 1971 to 1977.

All of the Rider editions up to 1939 were available with a small guide written by A. E. Waite providing an overview of the traditions and history of the cards, texts about interpretations, and extensive descriptions of their symbols. The first version of this guide was published during 1909 and was titled The Key to the Tarot. In 1911, a revised version, The Pictorial Key to the Tarot, was issued, featuring black-and-white plates of all seventy-eight of Smith's illustrations.

In 2009, U.S. Games Systems published a commemorative deck titled "The Smith–Waite Centennial Deck" as part of The Pamela Colman Smith Commemorative Set celebrating the hundredth anniversary of the 1909 deck. This deck notably places Smith's name first and omits the publisher's name (Rider). In this vein, some contemporary tarot readers call the original deck and its various iterations the "Smith–Waite deck" in order to give proper credit to Smith's contribution to the deck.

== Copyright status ==
The original version of the Rider–Waite Tarot is in the public domain in all countries that have a copyright term of 70 years or fewer after the death of the last co-author. This includes the United Kingdom, where the deck was originally published.

In the United States, the deck became part of the public domain in 1966 (publication + 28 years + renewed 28 years). U.S. Games Systems has a copyright claim on their updated version of the deck published in 1971, but this only applies to new material added to the pre-existing work (e.g. designs on the card backs and the box).

== See also ==
- Tarot of Marseilles
- Thoth Tarot
