= Suit of cups =

Suit of tarot cards

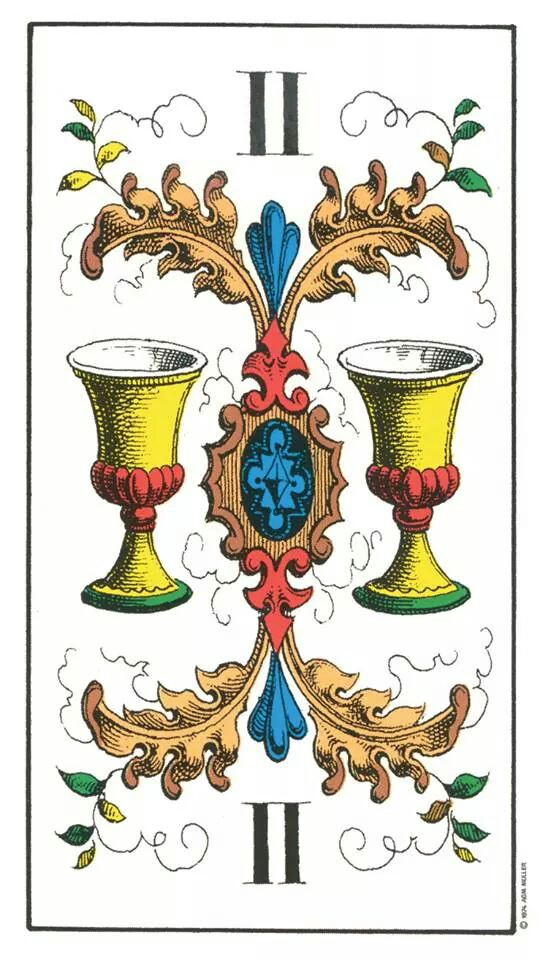
- Two of Cups from the 1JJ Tarot deck
- Deck: Minor Arcana

The suit of cups is one of four suits of tarot which, collectively, make up the Minor Arcana. They are sometimes referred to as goblets and chalices. Like the other suits of the Minor Arcana, it contains fourteen cards: ace (one), two through ten, page, knight, queen and king. Historically, the suit represented the First Estate (the Clergy). Tarot cards were originally designed for card play and are still used throughout much of Europe to play various Tarot card games. However, in English-speaking countries, where the games are largely unknown, Tarot cards came to be utilized primarily for divinatory purposes. In modern card games, the equivalent suits (depending on deck type and origin) are Hearts or Cups.

== Divinatory and occult meanings ==
In tarot, the element of cups is water, and the suit of cups pertains to situations and events of an emotional nature – in contradistinction to physical (suit of coins), or mindful (suit of swords), or creative natures (suit of wands). As such, when the tarot is used in divination, many cups signify an emotional focus for the reading. Additionally, cups were the symbol of the clergy in feudal times, and thus cup cards can also be interpreted as having to do with spiritual or religious matters.

Contemporary understandings of the Minor Arcana are largely defined by the illustrations of Pamela Colman Smith and the writings of A. E. Waite found as part of the Rider–Waite Tarot, the most popular tarot deck amongst English speakers, and its companion book The Pictorial Key to the Tarot.

=== Cards in the suit of Cups ===
- Ace of Cups: The ace of a given suit represents its symbolism in a potent and fresh state. Therefore, the Ace of Cups symbolically represents a strong presence of emotion or spirituality.
- Two of Cups: The two of a given suit typically indicates a duality. The Two of Cups typically depicts a pledge between two people, symbolising an emotional connection between two persons. In the Rider-Waite Tarot, the card portrays a young man and a woman each bearing a cup, as if presenting it to one another, while above is the Caduceus of Hermes.
- Three of Cups: This card typically indicates a time of merriment and celebration. The Rider-Waite Tarot depicts three Graces dancing, each maiden bearing a cup. However, if reversed, it indicates the need for alone time after exhaustion from social settings.
- Four of Cups: This card typically symbolises aversion. The Rider-Waite Tarot depicts a young man sitting cross-legged under a tree, his expression "one of discontent with his environment". There are three cups before him, and a hand from a cloud offers him a fourth cup.
- Five of Cups: The five of any suit can be considered difficult. In the Rider-Waite Tarot, a hooded figure with bowed head seems to mourn the three cups spilled before him. Behind the cloaked figure stand two cups, upright. Here it indicates hopes that have been dashed, or mourning over something that is lost. The hooded figure remains unaware of the two cups still standing behind—so the situation is not completely hopeless.
- Six of Cups: This card can indicate happy memories, as well as a certain clinging to the past and how things used to be. It can also indicate an invitation or gift coming from someone in your past. In the Rider-Waite Tarot, two youths are depicted playing in a garden, surrounded by six cups filled with flowers.
- Seven of Cups: Sometimes nicknamed "Fairy Favours", this card often represents a disparate and complex set of emotions. In the Rider-Waite Tarot, A young person sees seven cups among the clouds and visions therein. No explanations for the objects within the cups are given.
- Eight of Cups: In the Rider-Waite Tarot, eight cups are arranged in a row; a figure leaves these cups behind as if beginning a journey. This is described as "A man of dejected aspect is deserting the cups of his felicity, enterprise, undertaking or previous concern".
- Nine of Cups: The nine of a given suit typically represents a near completion of the symbolism (as with the suits of Cups and Pentacles), or an overwhelm by the symbolism (as with the suits of Swords and Wands). In the Rider-Waite Tarot, a well fed, self-satisfied individual sits with nine cups behind him.
- Ten of Cups: Total completion of the suit; the full potency of the suit's symbolism. In the Rider-Waite Tarot, a husband and wife join arms looking up at the rainbow over their house, while two young children dance. Ten cups are seen among the rainbow.
- Page of Cups: The Page of a suit is typically representative of a naïve but hopeful participant in the suit's meanings. In the Rider-Waite Tarot, an "effeminate" youth holds a cup from wherein a fish pokes its head.
- Knight of Cups: The Knight of a suit is typically representative of an active pursuit of the suit's meanings (as symbolised by the masculine figure). In the Rider-Waite Tarot, a young man on a horse with a winged helmet offers a cup.
- Queen of Cups: The Queen of a suit is typically representative of the passive mastery of the suit's meanings. In the Rider-Waite Tarot, a queen on her throne at the seaside holds a cup, seeing visions within. It may indicate a woman who has the gift of intuition and is able to offer good advice.
- King of Cups: The King of a suit is typically representative of the active mastery of the suit's meanings. In the Rider-Waite Tarot, a king holding a scepter floats upon the water.

=== Card images in the Rider–Waite tarot deck ===
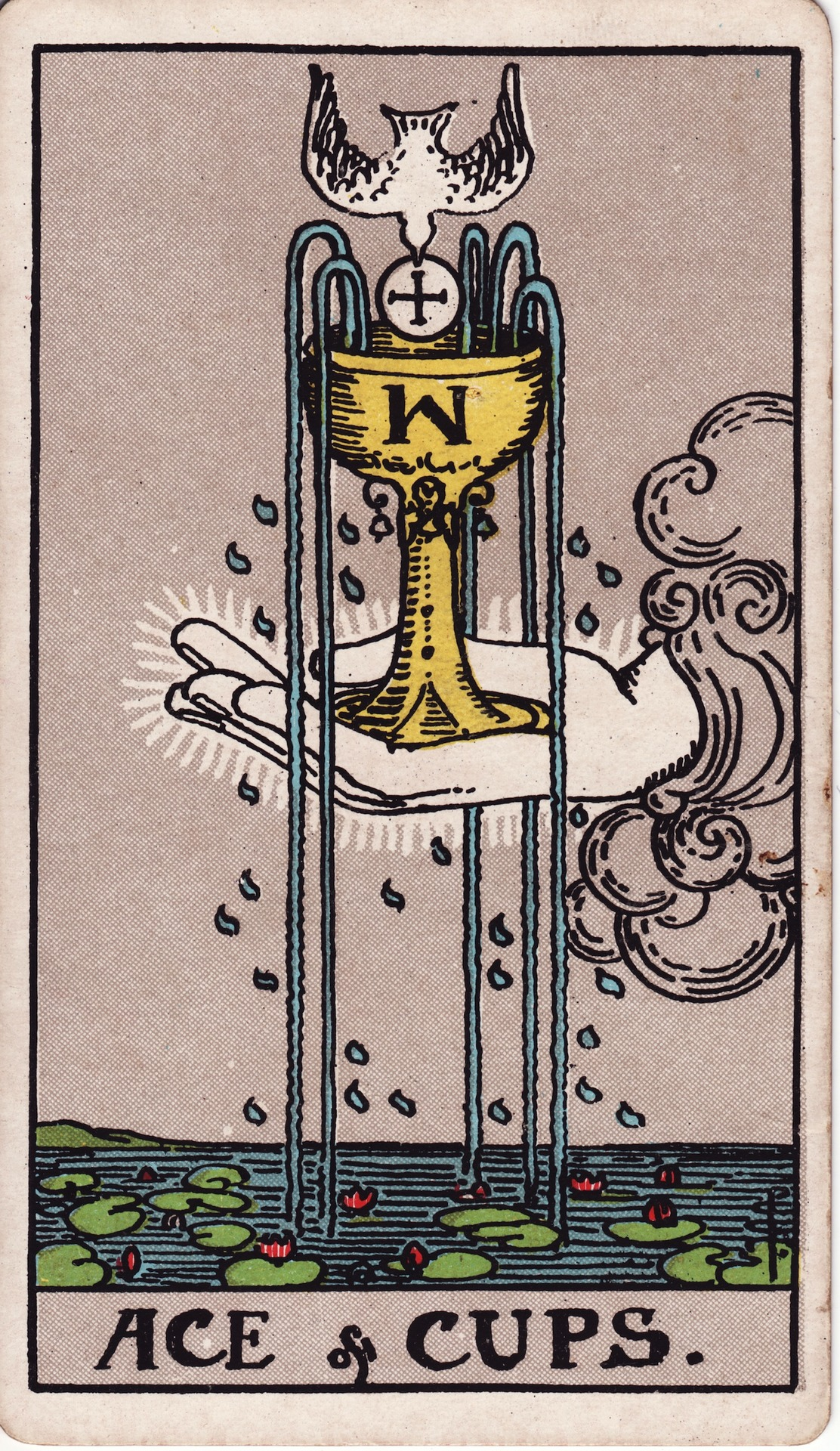
Ace of Cups

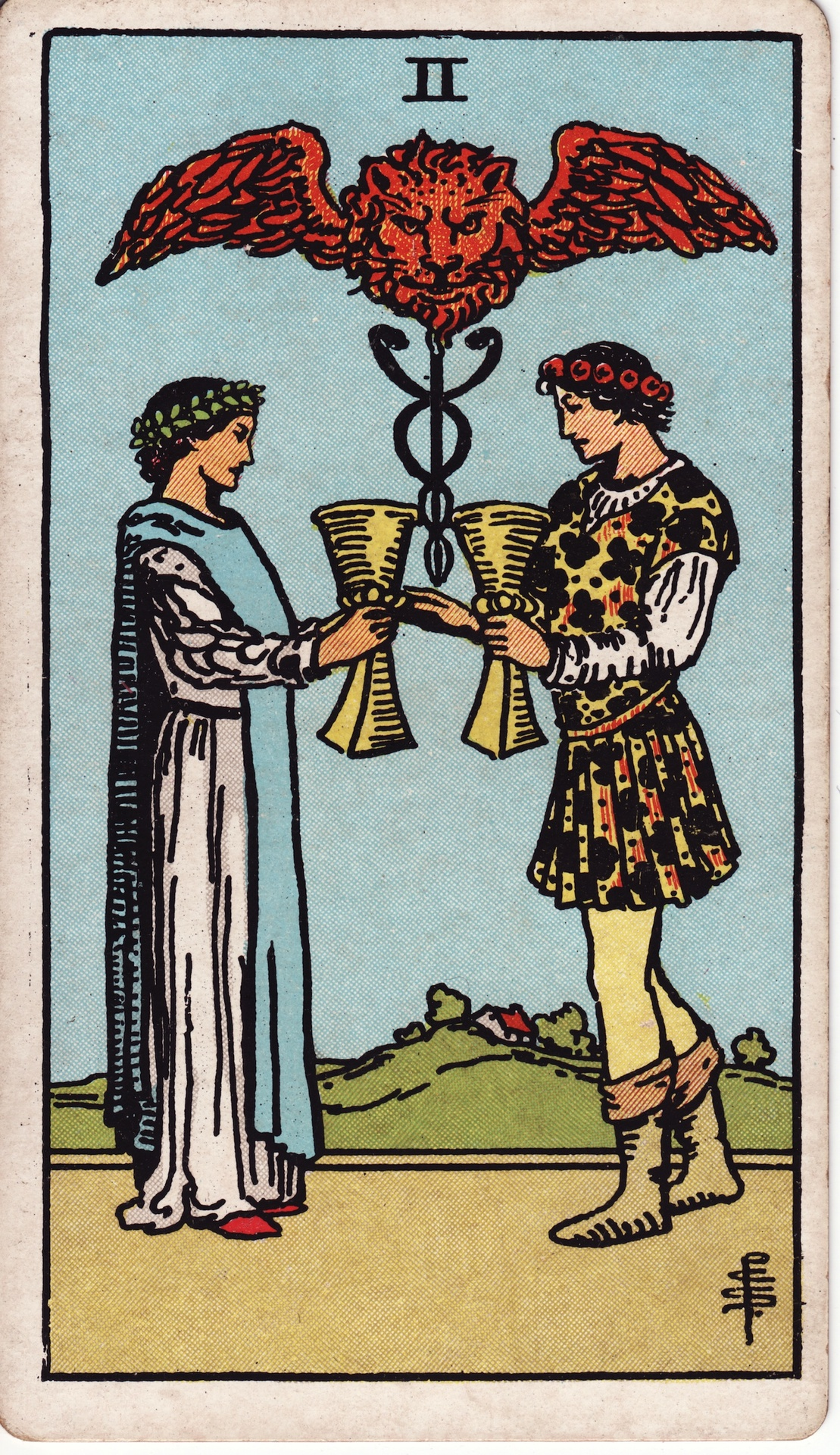
Two of Cups

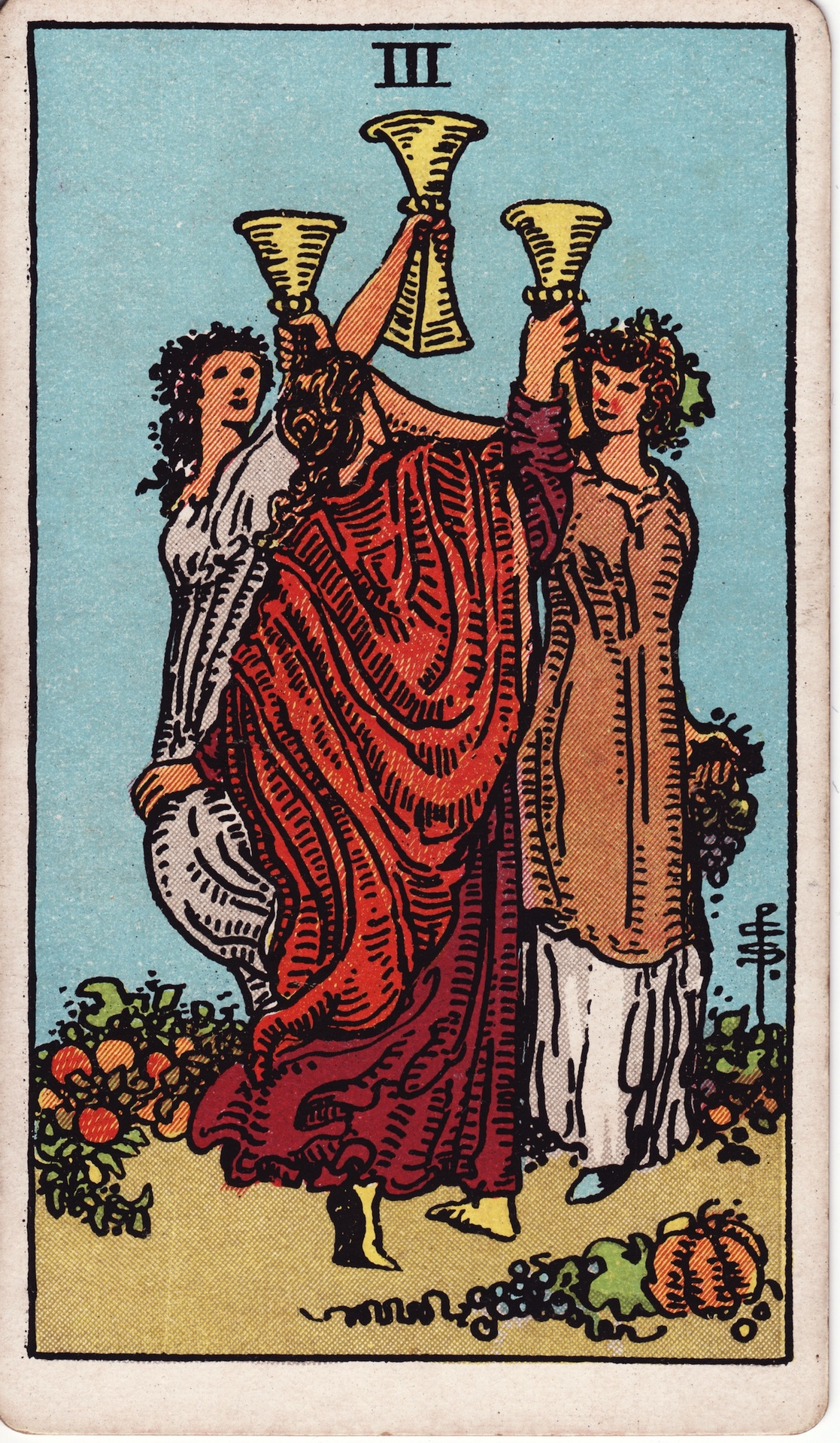
Three of Cups

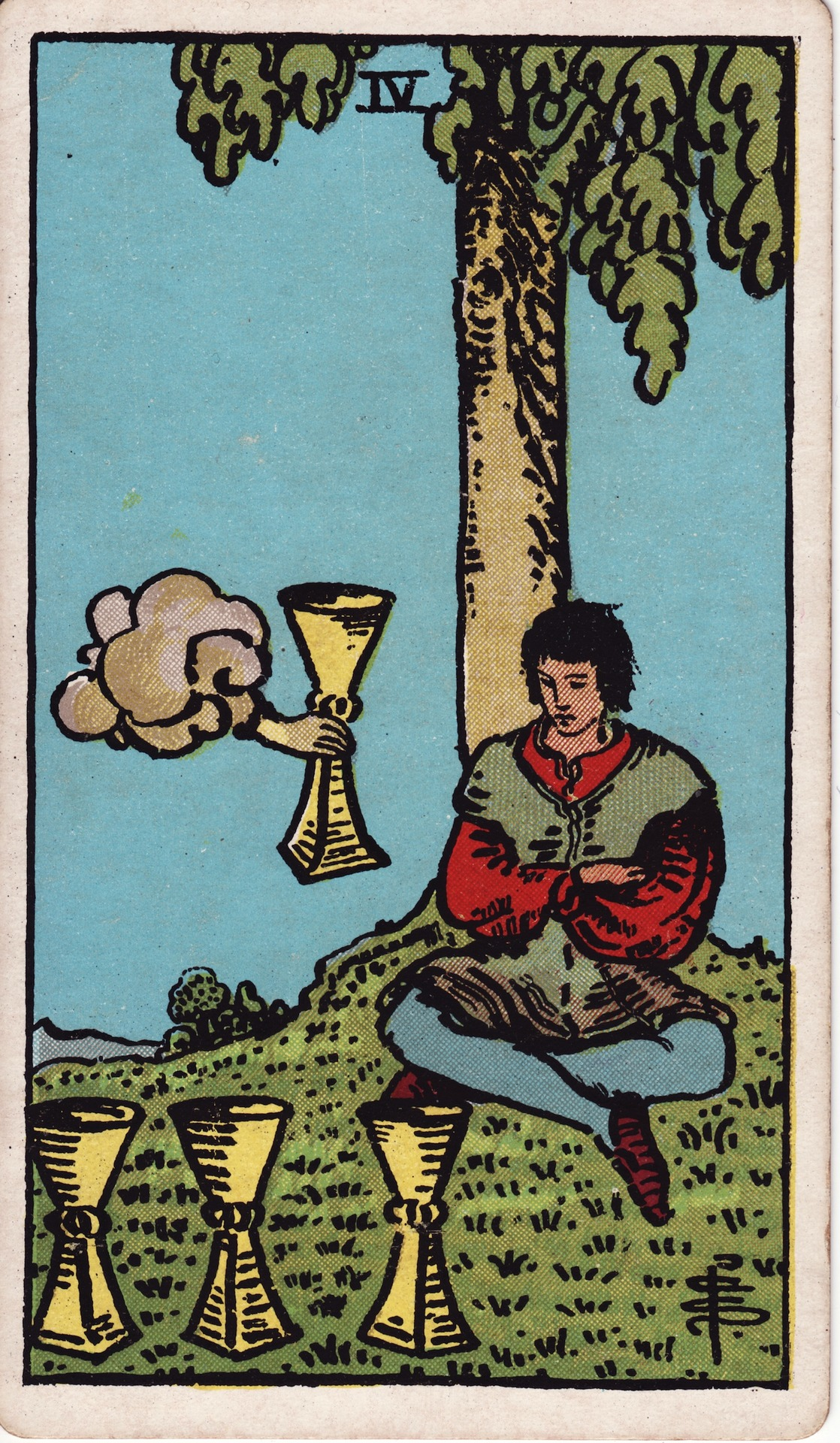
Four of Cups

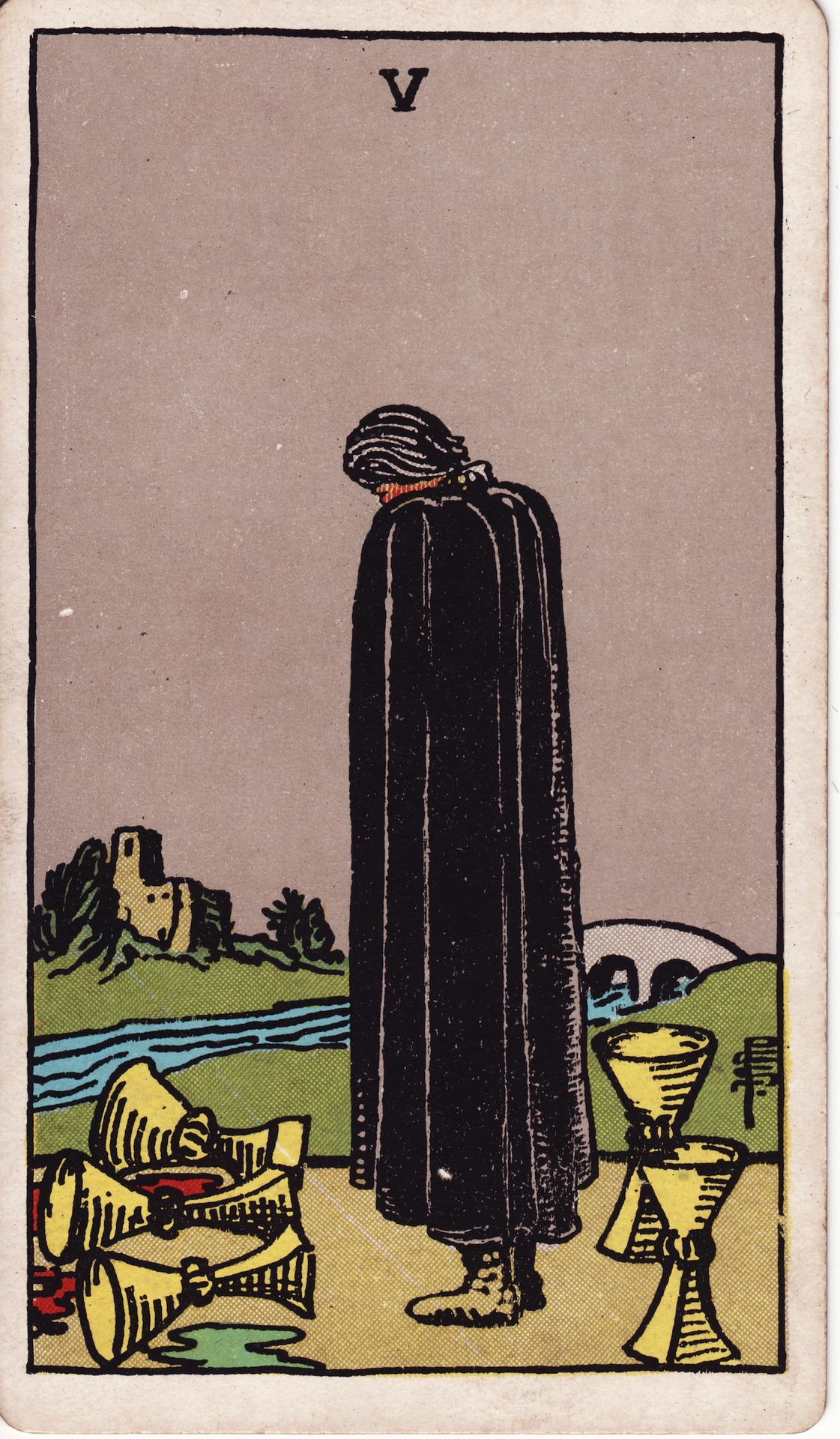
Five of Cups

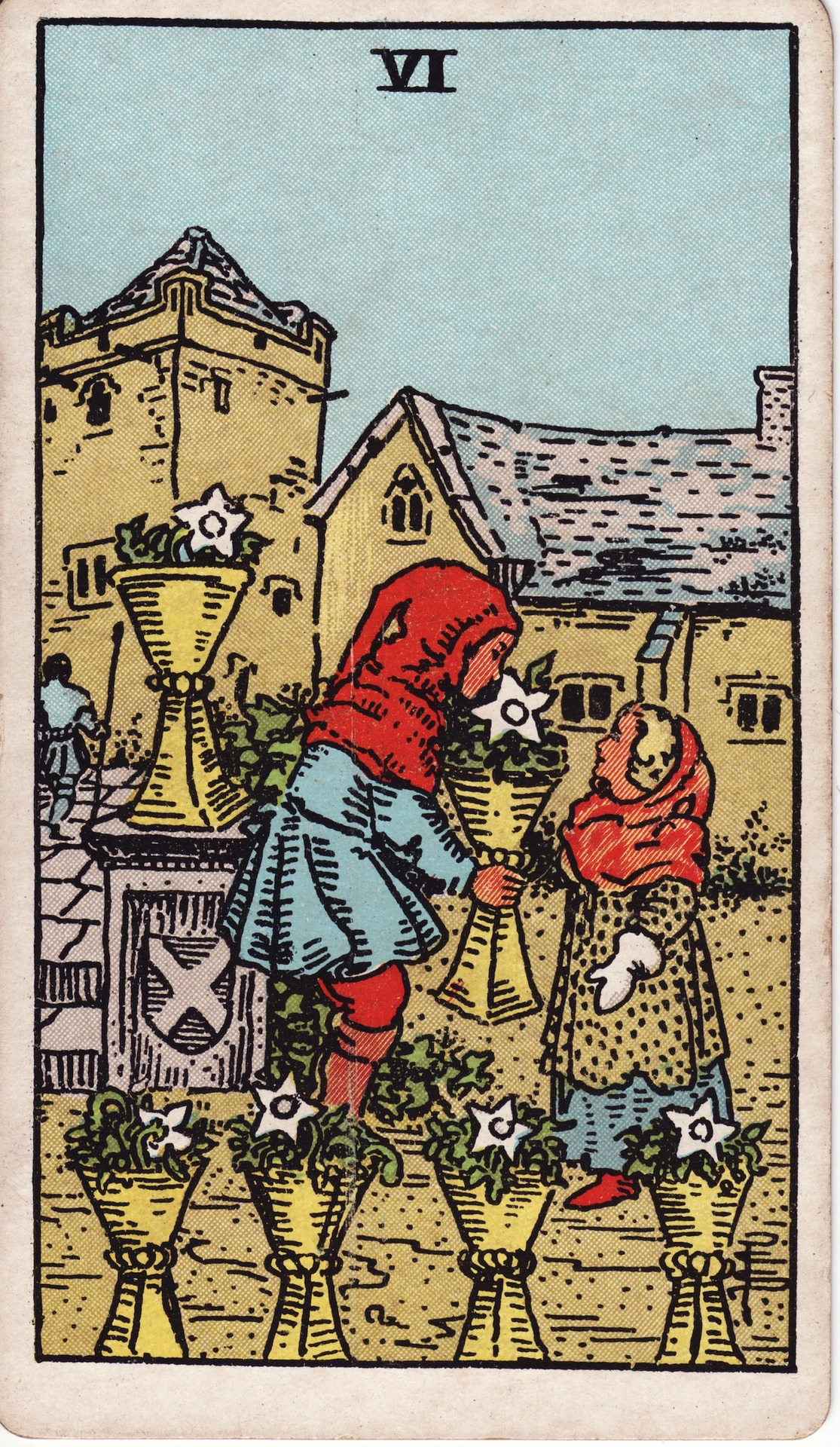
Six of Cups

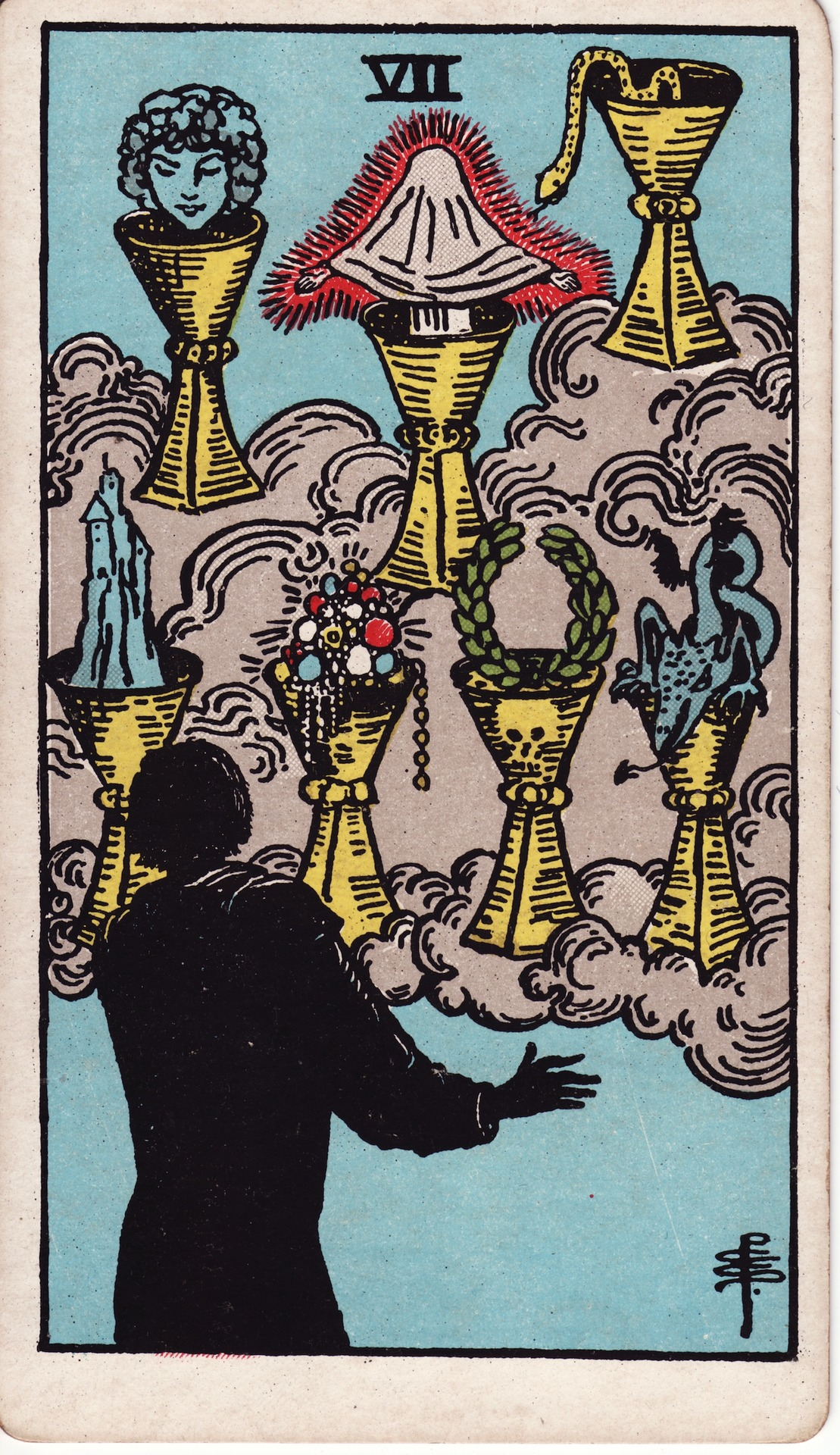
Seven of Cups

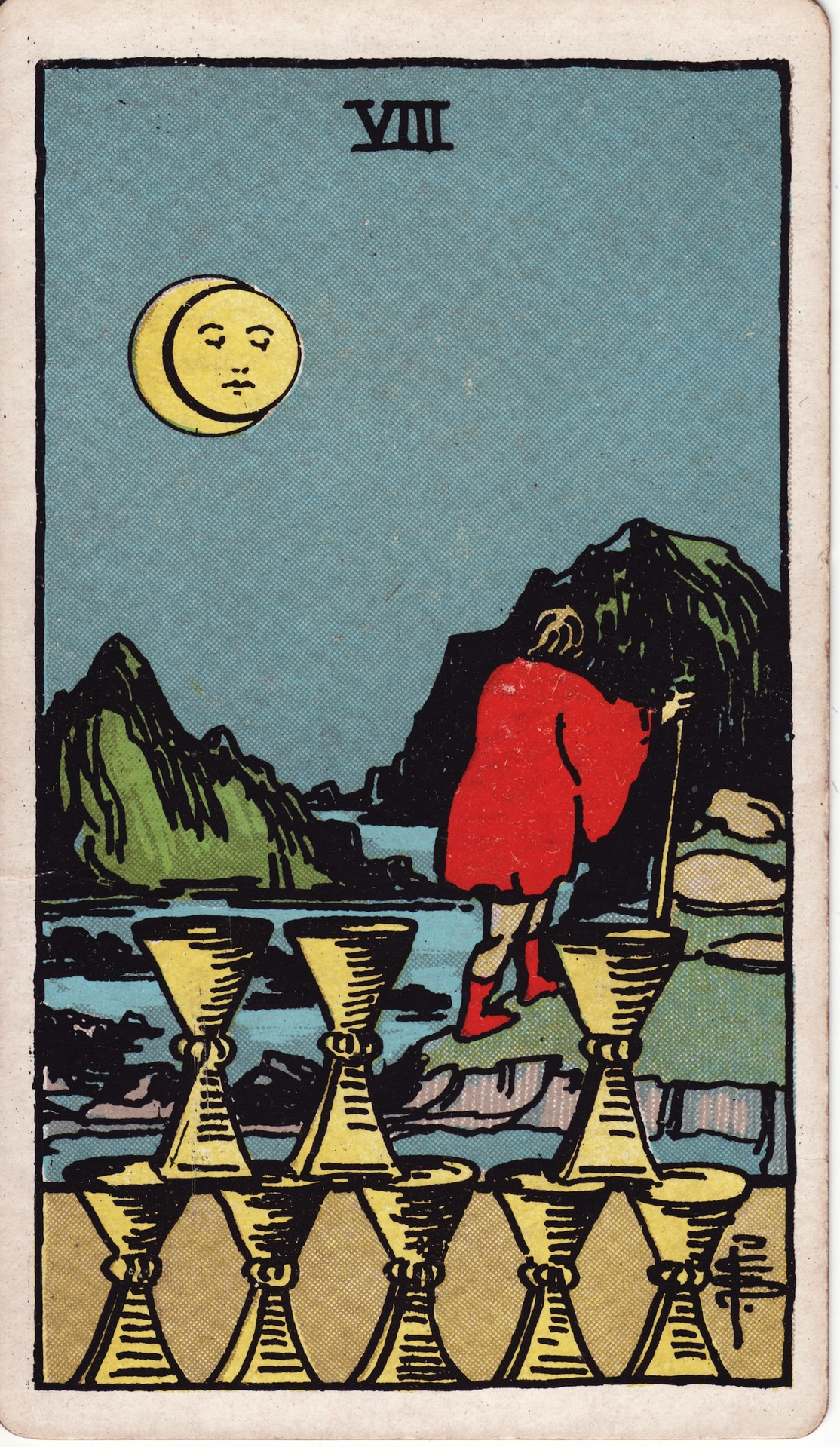
Eight of Cups

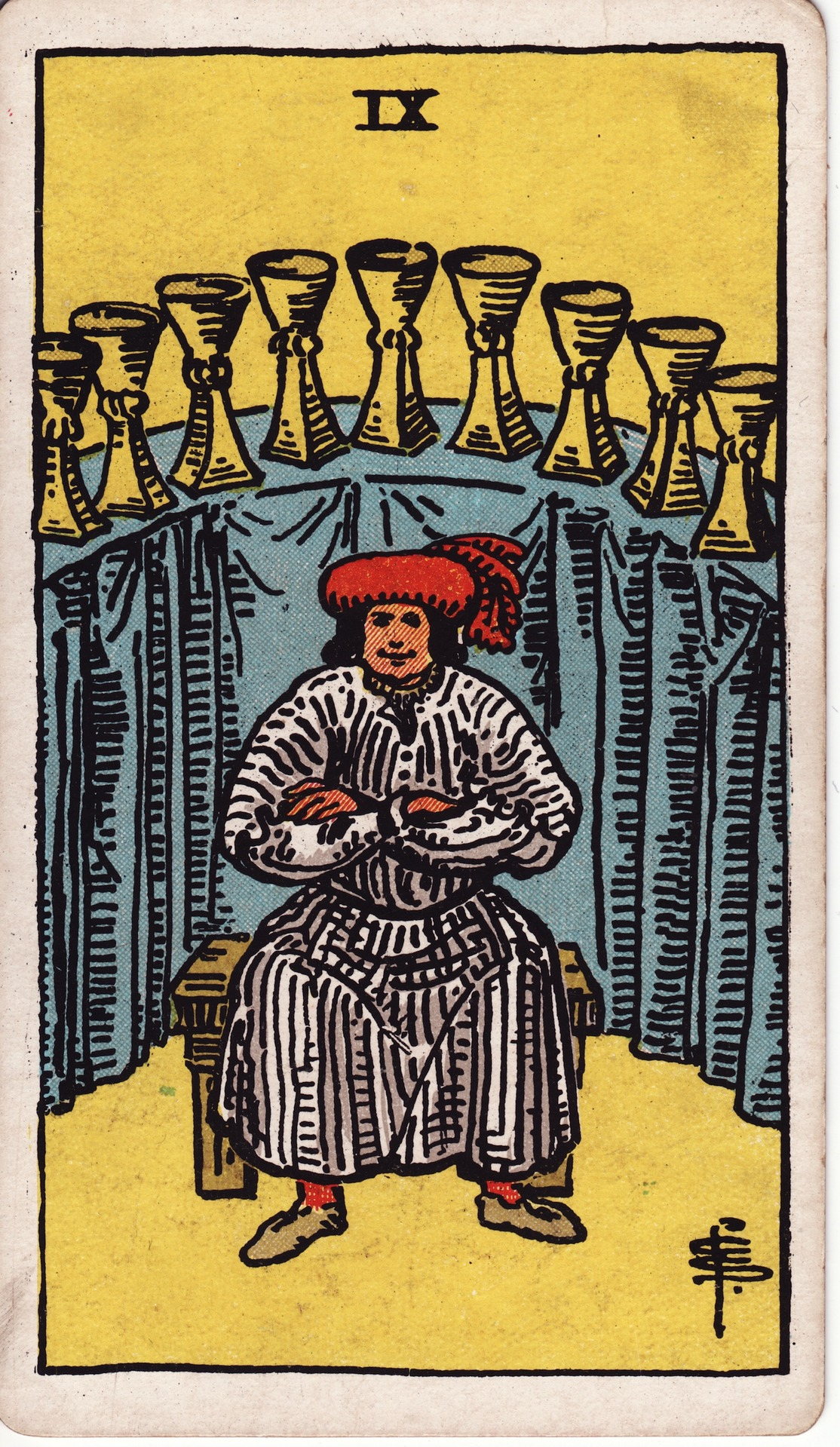
Nine of Cups

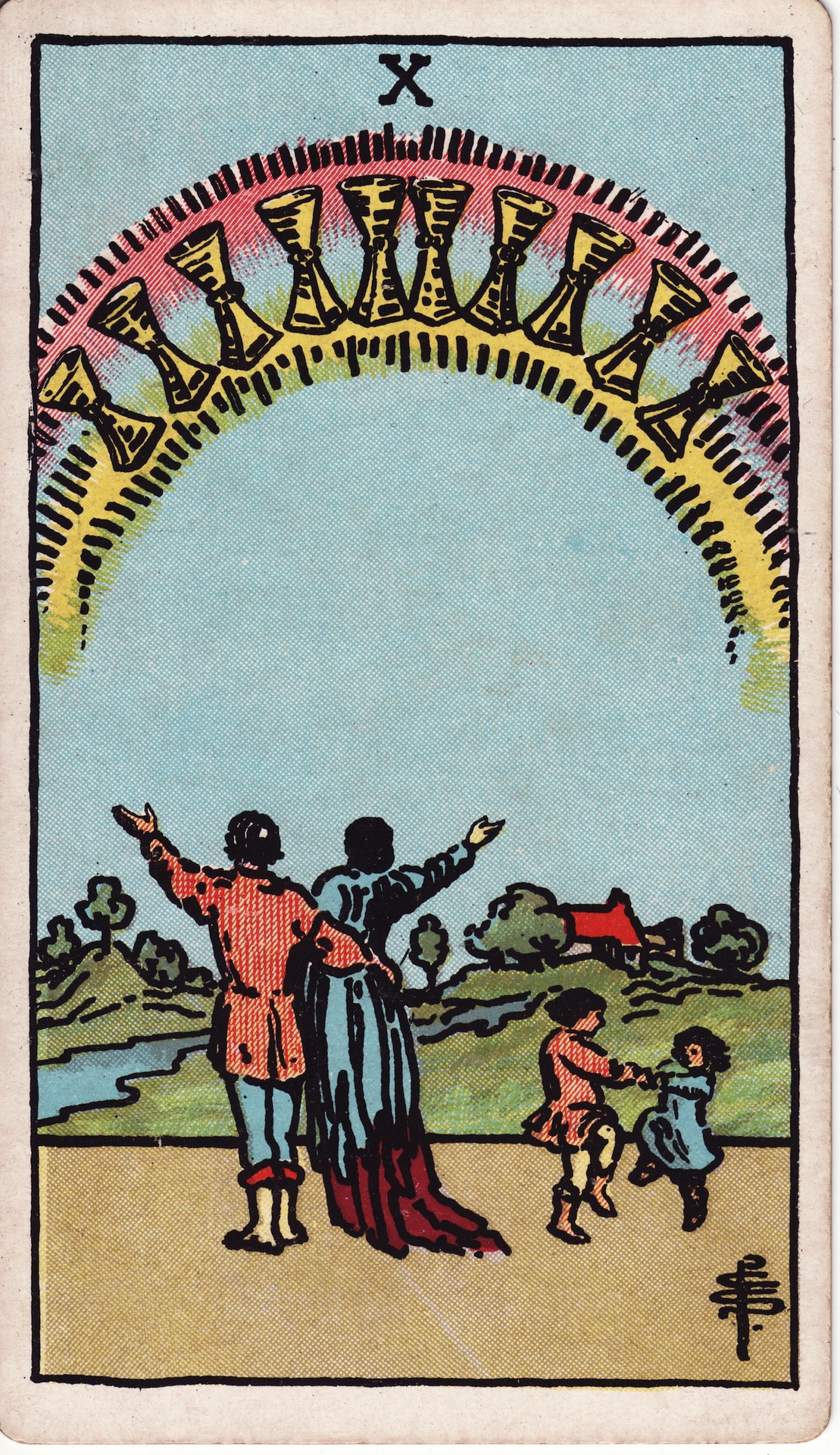
Ten of Cups

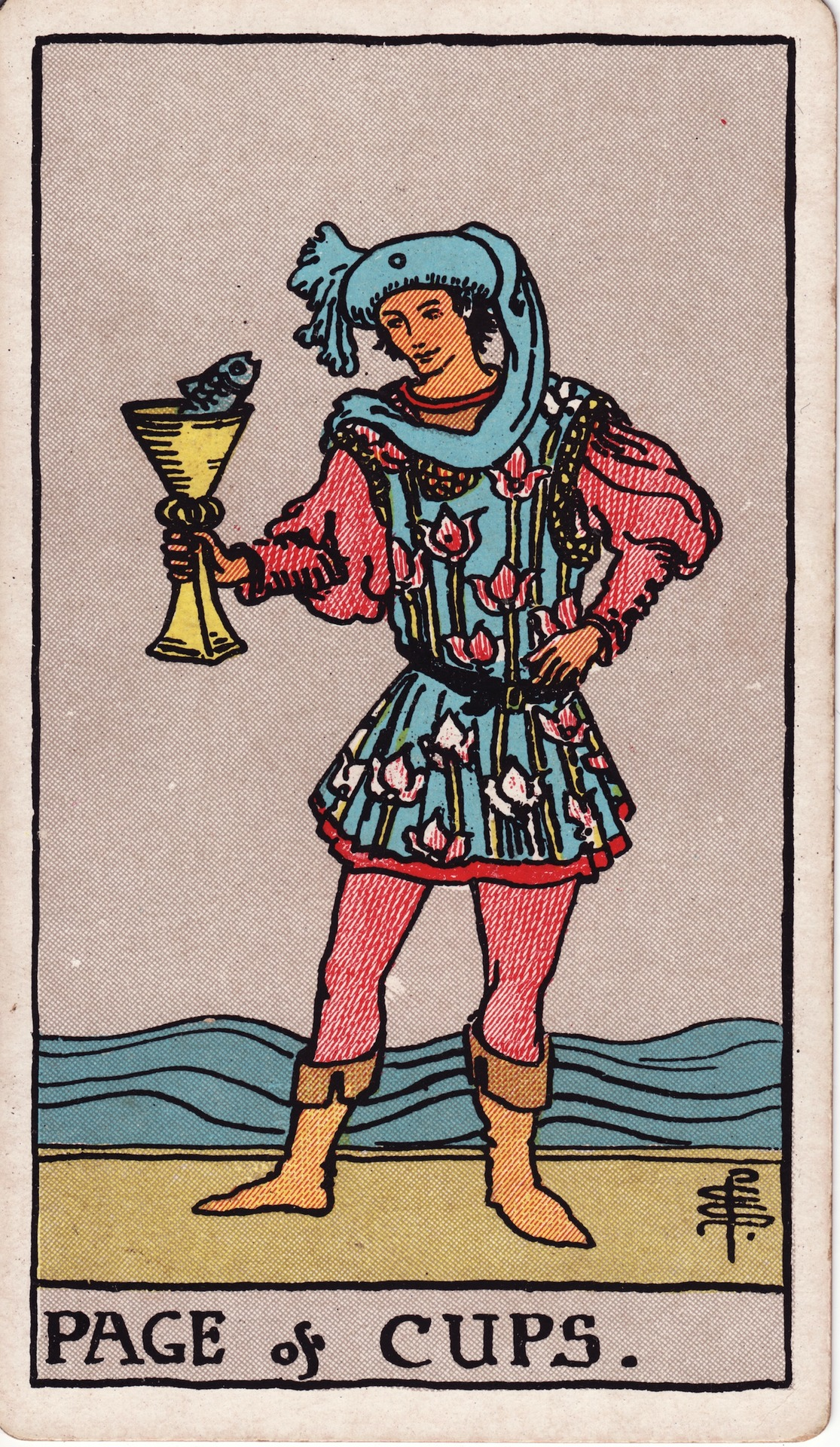
Page of Cups

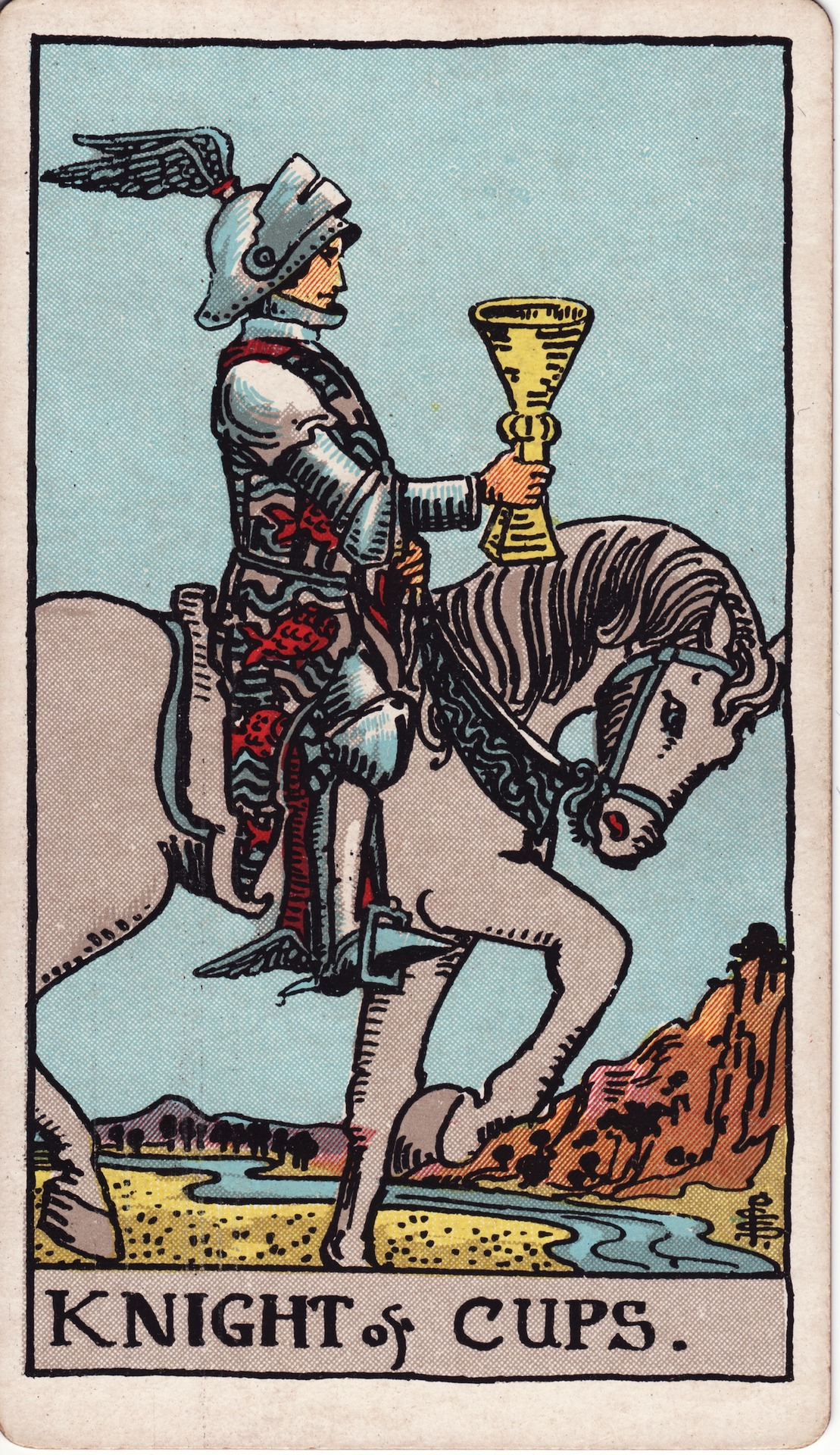
Knight of Cups

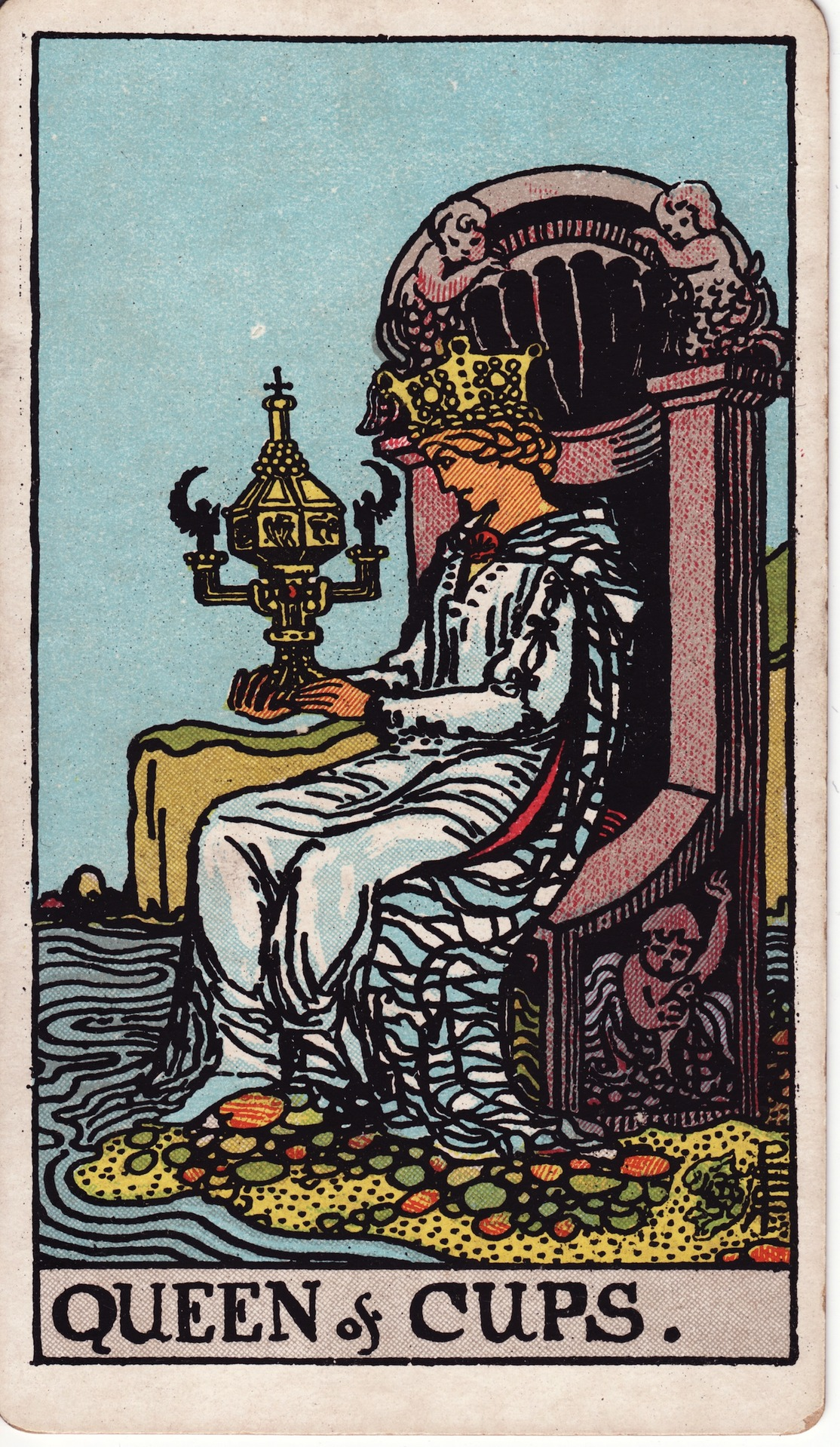
Queen of Cups

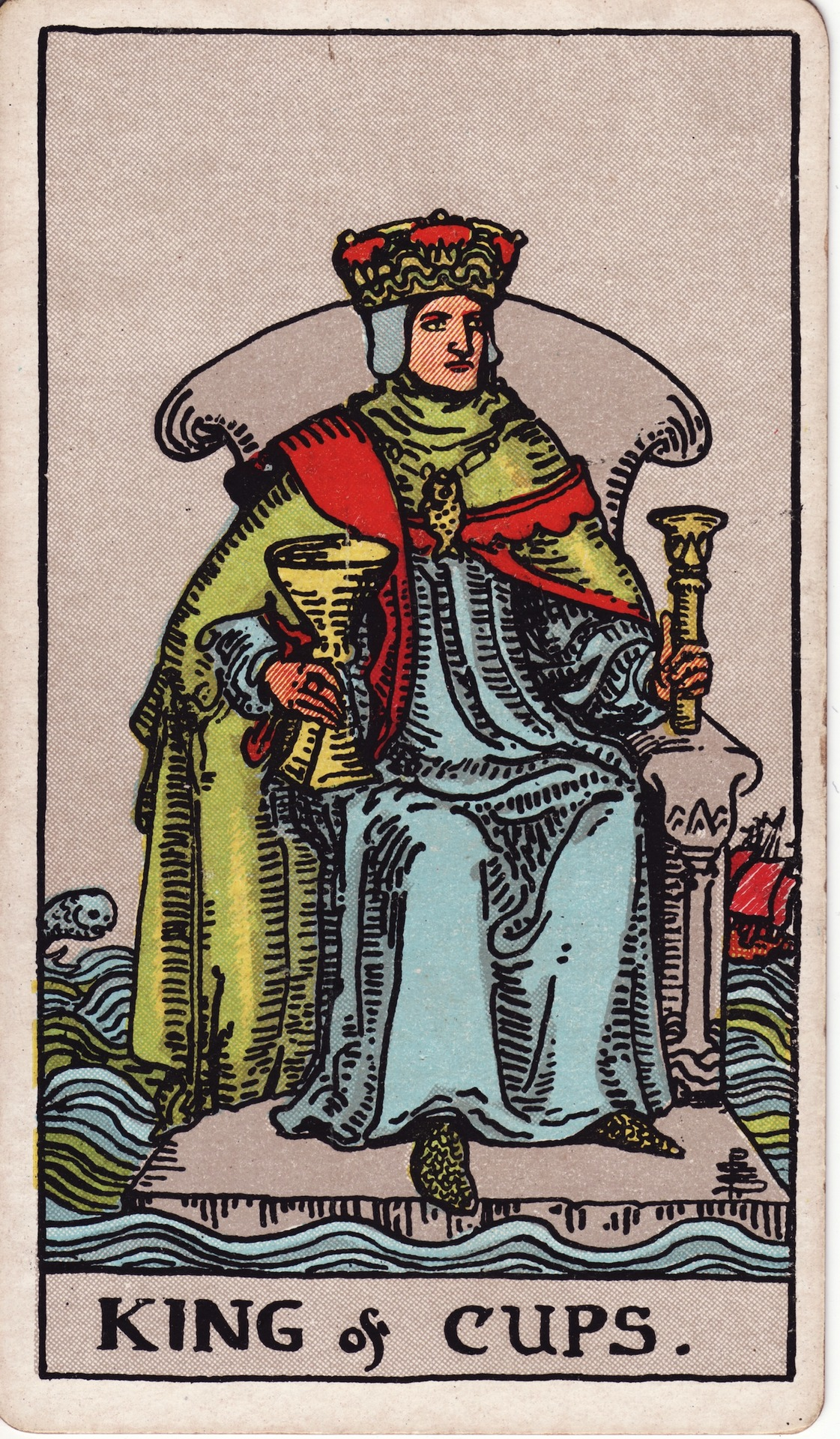
King of Cups

== See also ==
- Cups – suit of Latin (Italian/Spanish) playing cards
