= Alfredo Galán =

Spanish serial killer

Alfredo Galán Sotillo
- Born: Alfredo Galán Sotillo; 5 April 1978 (age 48); Puertollano, province of Ciudad Real, Castile-La Mancha, Spain
- Other names: The Playing Card Killer; The Deck of Cards Killer; The Tokarev Killer
- Occupation: Security guard
- Conviction: Murder
- Penalty: 142 years and 3 months imprisonment; €609,182 in damages (equivalent to €959,945.65 or US$1,114,588.09 in 2026)

Details
- Victims: 6 deaths, 2 wounded
- Span of crimes: 24 January – 18 March 2003
- Country: Spain
- Date apprehended: 3 July 2003

Alfredo Galán Sotillo (born 5 April 1978) is a Spanish serial killer who killed six people and wounded two from 4 January - 18 March 2003.

== Early life ==
Alfredo Galán was born in Puertollano, province of Ciudad Real, Castile-La Mancha, Spain. Galán became class president in high school but was remembered as unremarkable and introverted. In September 1998, he joined the Spanish Army and became a corporal in the 31st Mech Regiment "Asturias" of Madrid and participated in humanitarian missions in Bosnia. He was sent back to Spain to help deal with the cleanup of the Prestige oil spill. Galán stole a car and was sent to the Gómez Ulla Military Hospital in Madrid. He was diagnosed with neurosis and anxiety and continued drinking. In March 2003, he began working as a security guard at Madrid–Barajas Airport.

== Murders ==
On 24 January 2003, Galán shot 50-year-old Juan Francisco Ledesma in the head in front of his 2-year-old son. On 5 February, the body of 28-year-old airport cleaner Juan Carlos Martín Estacio was found shot in the head. An ace of cups was left nearby. Later the same day, Galán entered Bar Rojas in Alcalá de Henares and shot 3 people: the bar owner, 38-year-old Teresa Sánchez García survived multiple gunshots; her 18-year-old son Mikel Jiménez Sánchez and 57-year-old customer Juana Dolores Ucles López were killed. On 7 March 2003, 27-year-old Santiago Eduardo Salas was shot in the face by Galán, but survived. Salas's friend, 29-year-old Anahid Castillo Ruperti, was able to escape unharmed. A two of cups was dropped at the scene. On the evening of 18 March 2003, Galán shot and killed 40-year-olds Gheorghe Magda and his wife Doina, a Romanian couple, in Arganda del Rey in Madrid as they walked home from work. Galán left two more tarot cards — the three and four of cups — at the scene. It was not originally his intention for playing cards to be his "signature". He only began leaving cards after the media sensationalized the fact that a card had been found by a victim's body.

== Aftermath ==
On 3 July 2003, while severely inebriated, Galán surrendered at a police station and confessed to being "The Playing Card Killer." His confession included details about pen markings on the cards that were not public. Upon sobering up, he recanted, but ballistics irrefutably linked spent cartridges in his residence to the murders. It was reported that in some of the murders, Galán had wished his victims good morning and ordered them to kneel before shooting them. He killed his victims with a Tokarev 7.62-caliber TT-33 that he had bought while he was in the army in Bosnia. He smuggled the gun into Spain by hiding it in a television set.

On March 9, 2005, he was sentenced to 142 years and 3 months imprisonment and ordered to pay €609,182 (€959,945.65 in 2026) in damages to the victims.

He will be released in 2028 after 25 years in prison.

== See also ==
- David Berkowitz
- List of serial killers by country
- Koko (novel)
