= Three of Cups =

Tarot card of the Minor Arcana

Three of Cups from a deck of Italian cards

The Three of Cups is the third card on the suit of cups. In tarot, it is part of the Minor Arcana. In some decks the suit is named chalices or goblets instead. This card is used in game playing as well as in divination.

== Divination usage ==
This card often carries the meaning of joyful social contact, although it may be considered to be rather superficial, unlike the Two of Cups which is considered more personal. There's agreement, general harmony, frivolity, and sometimes it is associated with birth, especially if it comes up with other birth-related cards such as The Empress.

== Rider–Waite symbolism ==
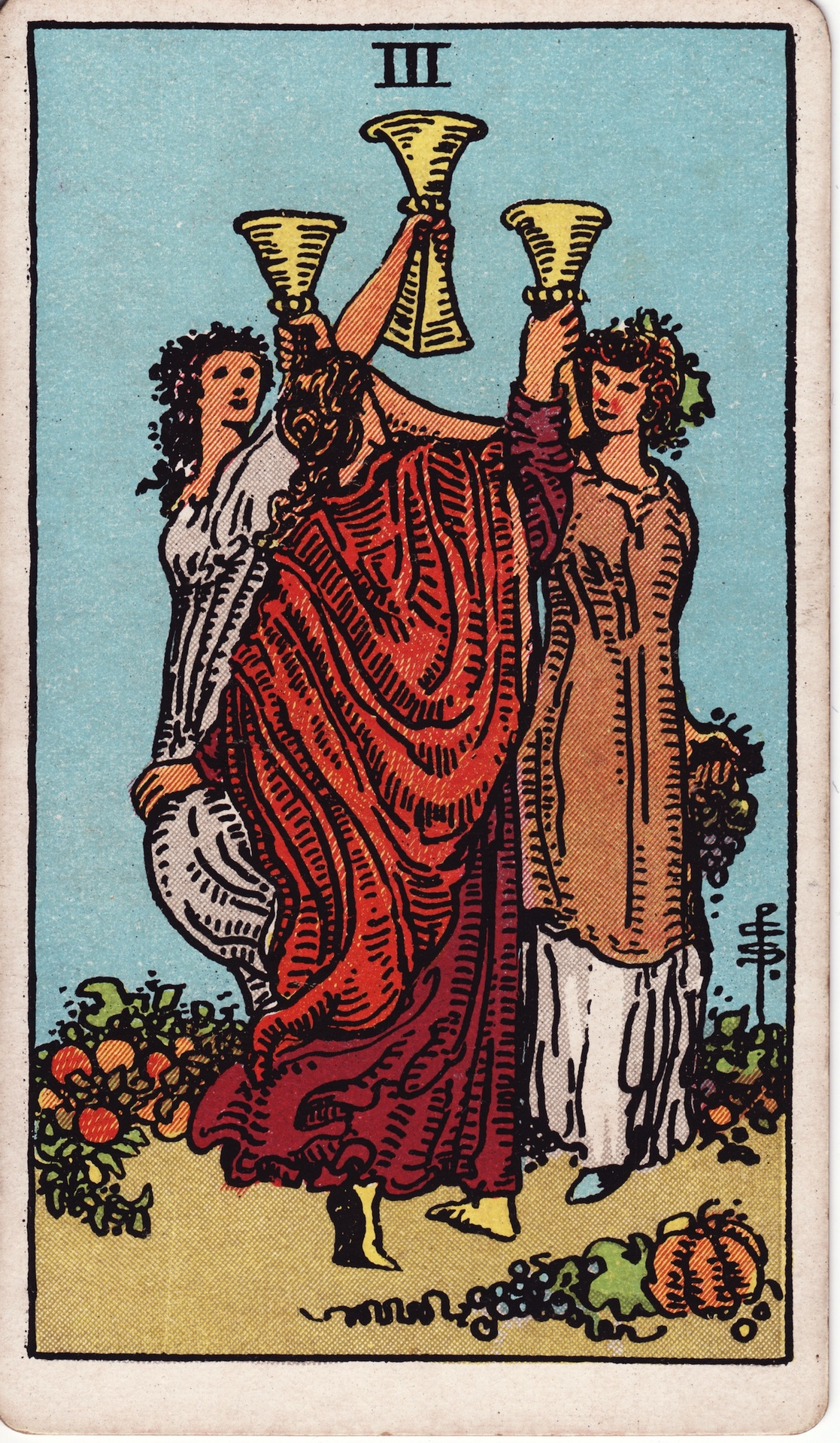
Three of Cups from the Rider–Waite tarot deck

The Three of Cups represents groups coming together to focus on a common emotional goal. People reach out emotionally to one another. It speaks of a sense of community, and can indicate the time to get more involved by helping. An inner passion for caring may be discovered, and energy put forth toward a goal will be positive and nurturing. It can also signal that this is the time to reach out if things have been particularly rough in the past. This card stands for all forms of support including formal organizations such as counseling or other social services. It's important that when the need for support is recognized that action is taken. This is the best time to do that. Reversed, the Three of Cups suggests that isolation from others is occurring. It is the time to take charge of the situation and to get out into the community. Consider joining a group or organization, and if the need for support is present, seek out the necessary resources. The card also indicates short-term romantic relationships, which can be beneficial if the querent is not seeking for long-term relationships.

== In other decks ==
In the Thoth tarot deck this card is labeled abundance, and is associated with the second decan of Cancer, said to be ruled by the Moon in astrology. Those born during the cusps of Gemini/Cancer (June 18-24) and Cancer/Leo (July 19-25) are said to hold traits of both star signs, therefore, being influenced by both planets. Gemini ruled by Mercury whilst the Leo is ruled by the Sun.

== In fiction ==
In the first Circle of Three novel, the Three of Cups comes up in a tarot reading and convinces the main character to pursue her Wiccan studies and befriend the two girls whom she met through her original encounter with witchcraft.
