= Ace of Cups =

Tarot card of the Minor Arcana

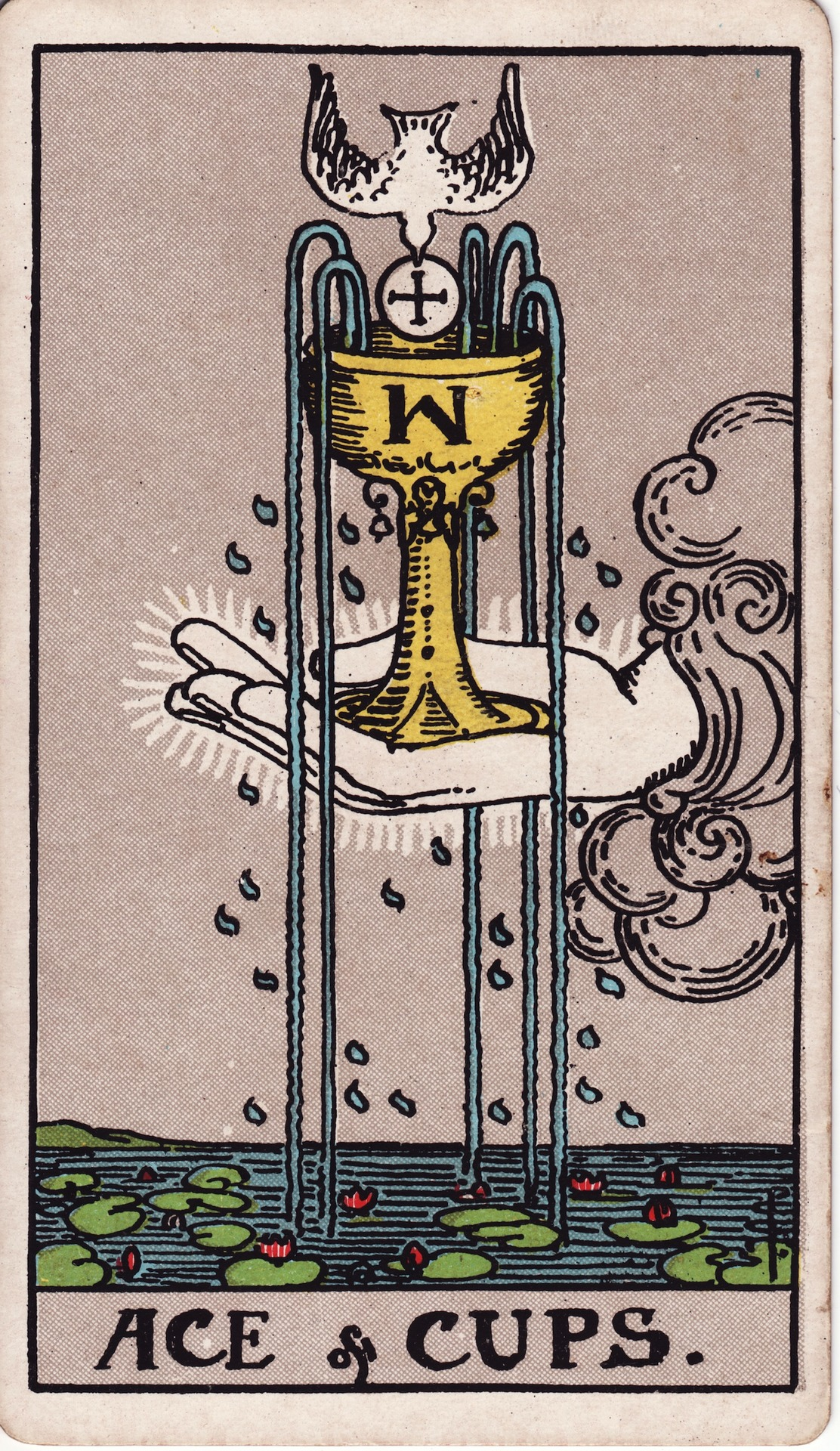
Ace of Cups from the Rider–Waite tarot deck

The Ace of Cups is a card used in Latin-suited playing cards (Italian, Spanish and tarot decks). It is the ace from the suit of cups. In Tarot, it is part of what card readers call the "Minor Arcana", and as the first in the suit of cups, signifies beginnings in the area of the social and emotional in life.

Tarot cards are used throughout much of Europe to play tarot card games. In English-speaking countries, where the games are largely unknown, tarot cards came to be utilized primarily for divinatory purposes.

A. E. Waite wrote that the card depicts the Holy Grail.

== Symbolism ==
In Tarot reading, the Ace of Cups means joy and inner peace from friends and family. In the Rider–Waite–Smith deck, the five streams pouring out of the cup represent the five senses: sight, smell, hearing, taste, and touch.

As a symbol of possibility in the area of deep feelings, intimacy, attunement, compassion and love, in divination, it shows that a seed of emotional awareness has been planted in the querent's life, though they may not yet recognize it. When the seed sprouts, it could take almost any form. It might be an attraction, strong feeling, intuitive knowing, or sympathetic reaction. On the outside, it could be an offer, gift, opportunity, encounter, or synchronistic event.

== Divination ==
This Ace requires the diviner to examine their life to see how creating love works there. This card often means that love is the essence of the situation, the heart of the matter. It may or may not be romantic love, and can depend on other cards around it. The inquirer may be guided to look for ways to connect with others at this level: is there someone to forgive, or is forgiveness even needed? Can anger be replaced with peace, division replaced with empathy? Is it necessary to let feelings show? Shared or kept secret, The Ace of Cups always indicates "your time" is coming or may be arriving presently.

This card also suggests inner attunement and spirituality. Cups are the suit of the heart, and the Ace stands for the direct knowing that comes from the heart. Suggestions for interpretation include: "Trust what your feelings are telling you," "Seek out ways to explore your consciousness, seek out paths that lead to your connections with Spirit," "Allow the power of your emotions to guide you in a new direction," and "Embrace the love that is the Ace of Cups."

== Significant combinations with other cards ==
- Ace of Cups and The Lovers - symbolizes the blossoming of a romantic relationship or deep emotional connection. Love is at the forefront.
- Ace of Cups and Two of Cups - represents the start of a new, mutually affectionate partnership. Unity and shared feelings are highlighted.
- Ace of Cups and Three of Swords - suggests healing after heartbreak. An opportunity for emotional growth and overcoming past grief.

== See also ==
- Libation
