= Queen of Cups =

Tarot card of the Minor Arcana

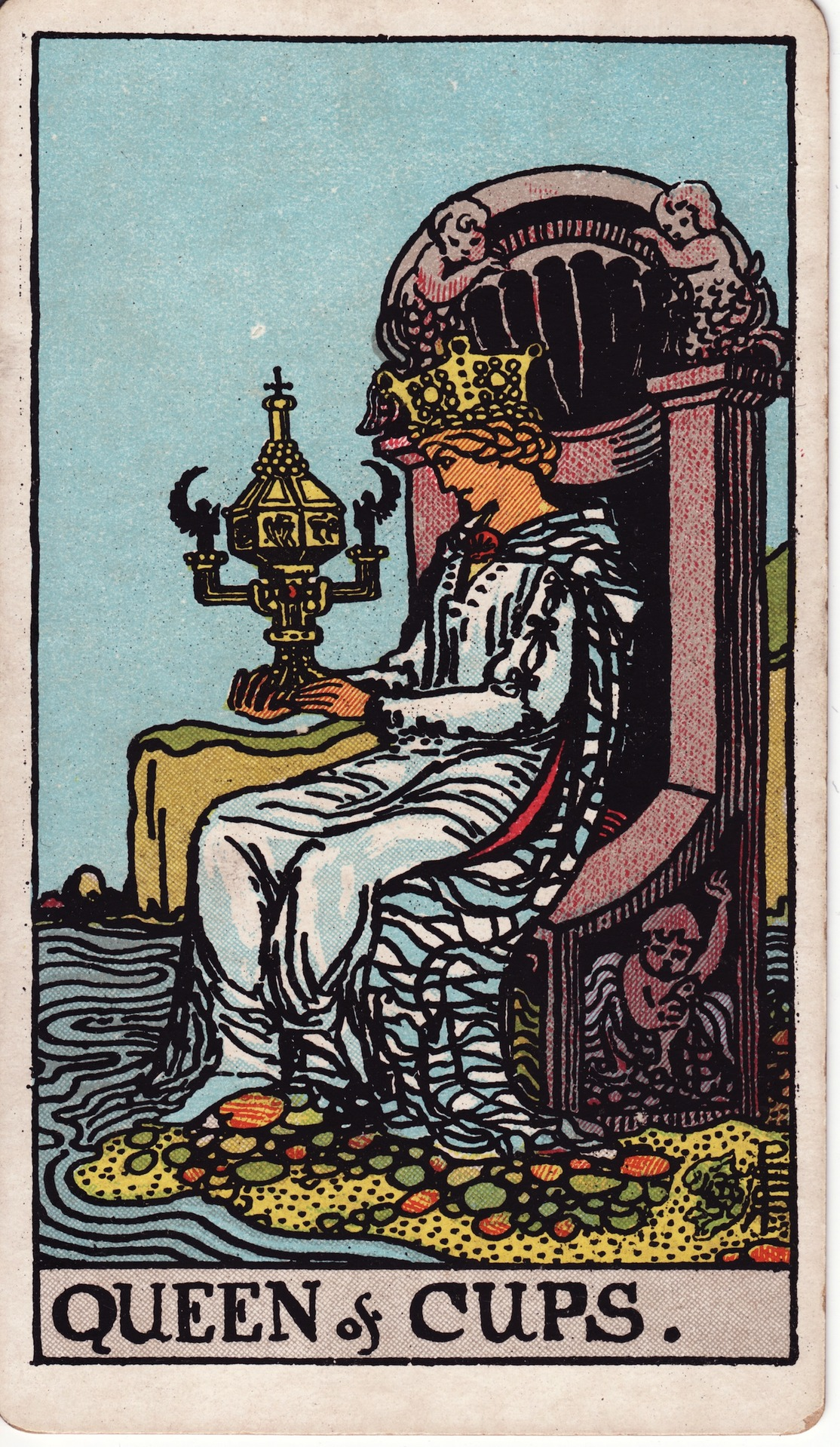
Queen of Cups from the Rider–Waite tarot deck

The Queen of Cups is a card used in Latin-suited playing cards (Italian, Spanish, and tarot decks). It is the queen from the suit of Cups. In Tarot, it is part of what tarot card readers call the "Minor Arcana". The Queen of Cups is associated with the element of Water and represents the nurturing, intuitive, and emotionally perceptive qualities of the Cups suit at their most mature feminine expression.

Tarot cards are used throughout much of Europe to play tarot card games. In English-speaking countries, where the games are largely unknown, tarot cards came to be utilized primarily for divinatory purposes.

== Symbolism ==
In the Rider–Waite depiction, the Queen of Cups sits on an ornate stone throne decorated with images of sea nymphs, fish, and scallop shells at the edge of a body of water. She holds an elaborate closed chalice with angel-shaped handles, gazing at it with deep concentration. Unlike most other cup cards in the deck, the chalice is sealed and covered, symbolizing the depths of the subconscious mind and emotions that are felt deeply but not always openly expressed.

The water at her feet represents the realm of the unconscious and the emotional currents that flow beneath the surface of everyday awareness. Small pebbles are visible along the shoreline, and the sky is typically depicted as clear, suggesting emotional clarity despite the depth of feeling. Her flowing robes and the water surrounding her throne reinforce her connection to the element of Water and its associations with intuition, empathy, and emotional depth.

The sealed nature of the Queen's chalice is a significant detail — it distinguishes her from the King of Cups, whose chalice is open. This sealed cup represents sacred inner knowledge that is protected and not shared indiscriminately, as well as the Queen's ability to contain and process deep emotions without being overwhelmed by them.

== Interpretation ==
=== Upright ===
In an upright position, the Queen of Cups represents compassion, emotional security, deep intuition, and nurturing wisdom. She embodies a personality that leads with the heart and understands the emotions of others on an instinctive level, often sensing feelings before they are verbally expressed. The Queen of Cups signifies someone who creates emotional safety for those around them, offering unconditional acceptance and gentle support without judgment.

In readings, the Queen of Cups may represent the querent themselves, a person in their life who embodies these empathetic qualities, or an invitation to connect more deeply with one's own emotional and intuitive nature. She frequently appears when matters of emotional healing, counseling, or creative expression through feeling are relevant to the situation.

In love readings, the Queen of Cups indicates a deeply caring and devoted partner who prioritizes emotional connection above all else. She represents the ideal of loving unconditionally while maintaining her own emotional boundaries — a nurturing presence that does not lose herself in the process of caring for others.

=== Reversed ===
When reversed, the Queen of Cups can indicate emotional insecurity, codependency, or the tendency to absorb others' emotions at the expense of one's own well-being. The reversed position may suggest someone who has become overwhelmed by their sensitivity, leading to emotional instability, mood swings, or withdrawal from relationships as a form of self-protection.

The reversed Queen may also represent emotional manipulation — using deep understanding of others' feelings as a tool for control rather than healing. Alternatively, it can indicate a person who has shut down their emotional and intuitive gifts, becoming disconnected from the very qualities that make the Queen of Cups so powerful in her upright position.

In some interpretations, the reversed Queen of Cups warns against martyrdom — sacrificing one's own needs completely in service of others' emotional demands, leading to resentment and exhaustion.

== In popular culture ==
The Queen of Cups appears in various artistic and literary works as a symbol of feminine emotional wisdom, intuitive power, and the depths of the subconscious mind. Her imagery has influenced depictions of water priestesses and empathic characters across fantasy and spiritual fiction.
