= Nine of Cups =

Tarot card of the Minor Arcana

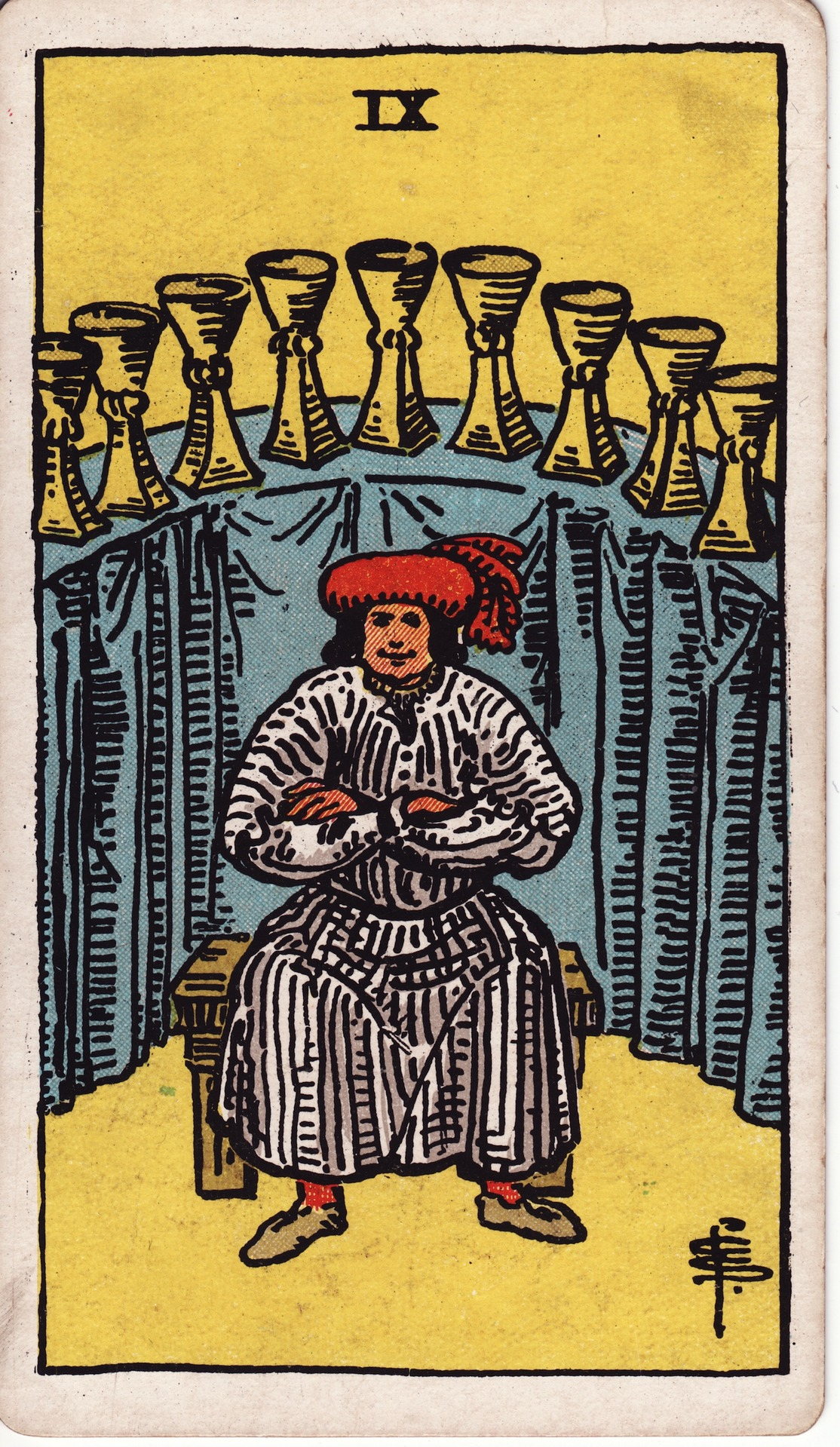
Nine of Cups from the Rider–Waite tarot deck

The Nine of Cups is a card used in Latin-suited playing cards which include tarot decks. It is part of what tarot card readers call the "Minor Arcana".

Tarot cards are used throughout much of Europe to play tarot card games. In English-speaking countries, where the games are largely unknown, tarot cards came to be utilized primarily for divinatory purposes.

== Divination usage ==
Having your wish fulfilled. Achieving what you desire. Obtaining your goal. Getting what you think you want. Having your dream come true.

Feeling satisfied. Indulging in a little smugness. Enjoying the situation just as it is. Feeling pleased as punch. Getting the results you hoped for. Feeling all's well with the world. Being contented.

Enjoying sensual pleasure. Experiencing luxury. Savoring a delicious meal. Appreciating the arts. Making love.

In its reversed position, this card indicates unrealistic wishes or dreams which are not destined to become reality.

In comparison to the next card in this suit, the Ten of Cups, it can be difficult for tarot novices to differentiate between these two cards as both symbolise emotional happiness. In tarot there is a direct relationship between cards of the same numeric value because they share the same numerological symbology. The nine of cups is directly related to the Hermit, card 9 of the Major Arcana. It therefore has an element of solitude about it. It's a card of emotional happiness and fulfilment which is enjoyed alone. Therefore, the main difference between the nine and Ten of Cups is that the nine is a card of emotional happiness and fulfilment which is enjoyed alone and the ten is a card of emotional happiness and fulfilment enjoyed collectively (i.e., a family, a community etc.).
