= The Lovers =

Tarot card of the Major Arcana

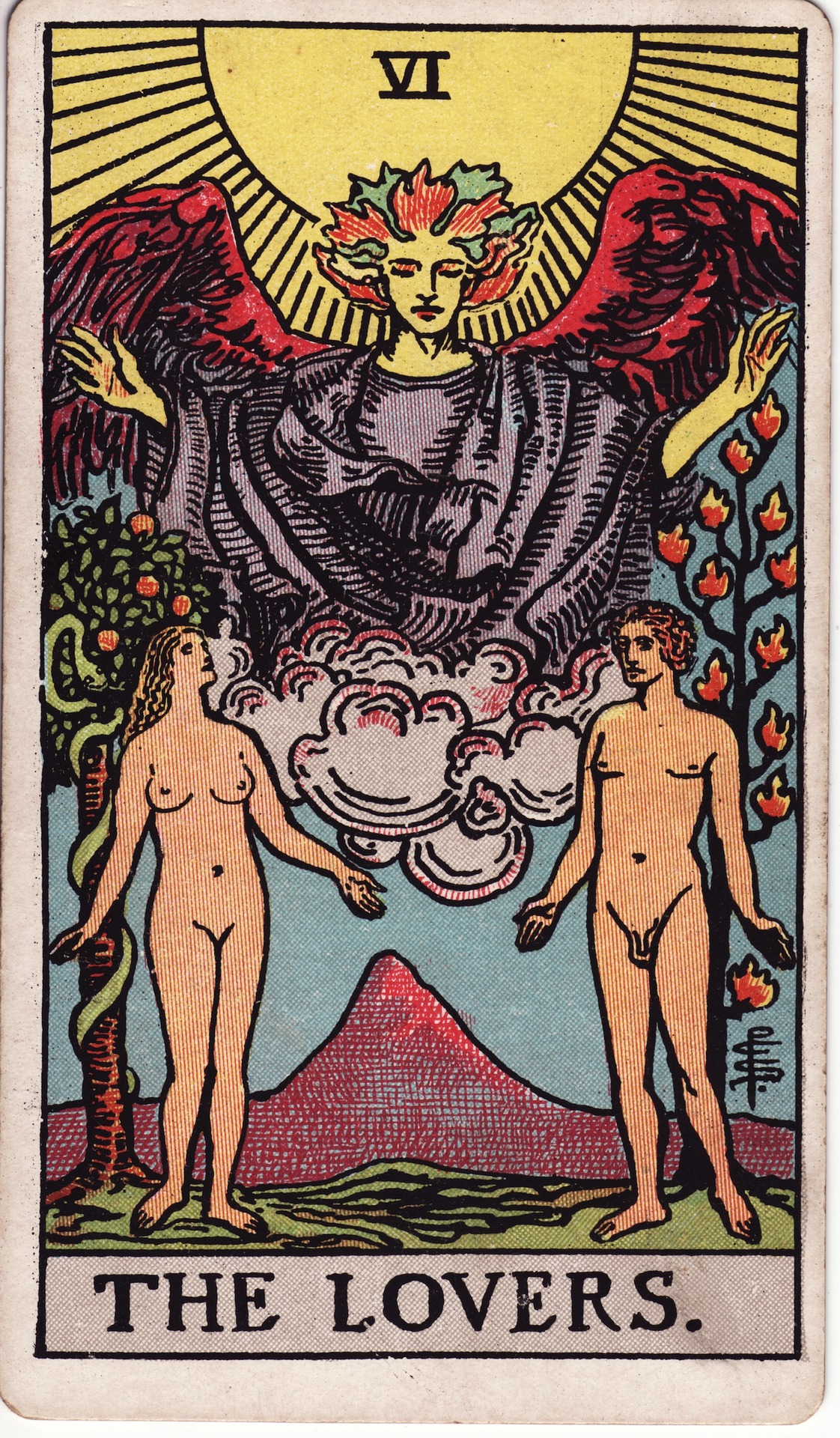
The Lovers (VI) in the Rider–Waite Tarot deck

The Lovers (VI) is the sixth trump or Major Arcana card in most traditional Tarot decks. It is used in game playing as well as in divination.

== Interpretation ==
Drawing by Robert M. Place

According to A. E. Waite's 1910 book Pictorial Key to the Tarot, the Lovers card carries several divinatory associations:

6. THE LOVERS.—Attraction, love, beauty, trials overcome. Reversed: Failure, foolish designs. Another account speaks of marriage frustrated and contrarieties of all kinds.

In some traditions, the Lovers represent relationships and choices. Its appearance in a spread indicates some decision about an existing relationship, a temptation of the heart, or a choice of potential partners. Often an aspect of the Querent's life will have to be sacrificed; a bachelor(ette)'s lifestyle may be sacrificed and a relationship gained (or vice versa), or one potential partner may be chosen while another is turned down. Whatever the choice, it should not be made lightly, as the ramifications will be lasting.

The Lovers is associated with the star sign Gemini, and indeed is also known as The Twins in some decks. Other associations are with air, the classical element associated with Gemini, Mercury, the ruling planet of Gemini, and the Hebrew letter ז (Zayin).

== Symbols ==
In the Rider–Waite deck, the imagery for this card is changed significantly from the traditional depiction. Instead of a couple receiving a blessing from a noble or cleric, the Rider–Waite deck depicts Adam and Eve in the Garden of Eden, overseen by an angel, possibly archangel Raphael. By reducing the number of human beings depicted in the card from three to two, Waite was able to reinforce its correspondence with Gemini. The symbolism includes:

- Archangel Raphael
- Tree of Life behind Adam, which bears 12 fruits identical to a fire
- Tree of Knowledge behind Eve, with a serpent clinging on it

== Significant combinations with other cards ==
- The Lovers and Three of Pentacles – indicates collaborative efforts leading to meaningful work relationships. Harmony in partnership choices enhances creative ventures.
- The Lovers and Two of Cups - indicates a decision is needed regarding a relationship, either romantic or otherwise, apart from a potential for a deeply satisfying and fulfilling connection with someone who shares your values and desires.

== In popular culture ==
The card is featured prominently in the 1973 James Bond film, Live and Let Die. In the movie, Bond meets Solitaire, a beautiful tarot reader who has the uncanny ability to see the future. Later in the film, Bond tricks her into bed by producing a pack filled with "the Lovers".

The card is featured as the power of side antagonist Steely Dan in the manga Jojo’s Bizarre Adventure and its anime adaptation.
