= Ten of Cups =

Tarot card of the Minor Arcana

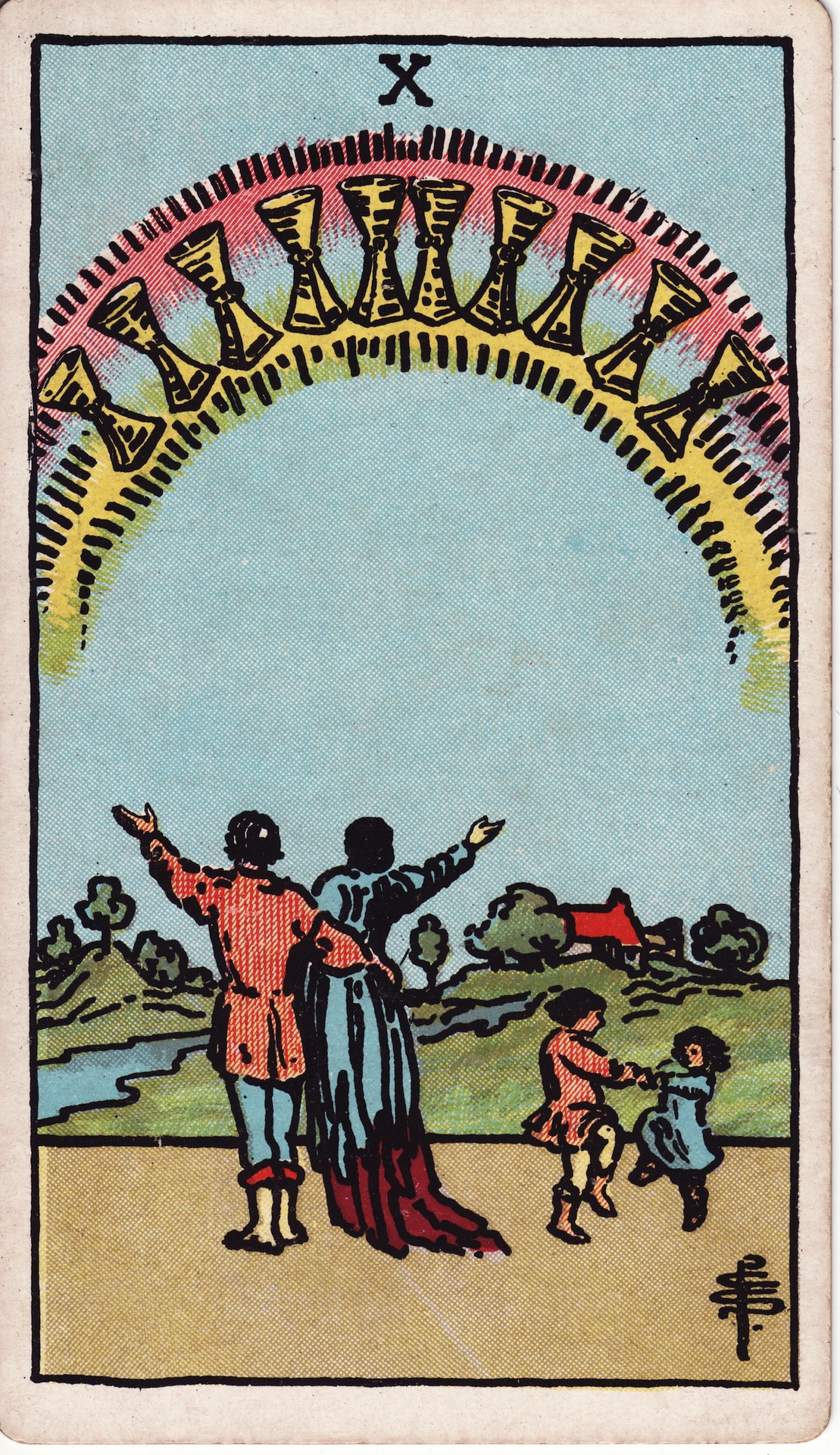
Ten of Cups from the Rider–Waite tarot deck

The Ten of Cups is a Minor Arcana tarot card. It is associated with the element of Water and is the tenth card in the Suit of Cups. The card is widely regarded as one of the most positive cards in the entire tarot deck, representing emotional fulfillment, family happiness, and harmonious relationships.

Tarot cards are used throughout much of Europe to play tarot card games. In English-speaking countries, where the games are largely unknown, tarot cards came to be utilized primarily for divinatory purposes.

== Symbolism ==
In the Rider–Waite depiction, a joyful couple stands with arms raised toward a rainbow arc of ten golden cups in the sky. Two young children play happily beside them, and a peaceful countryside with a river and a cottage appears in the background. The rainbow is a universal symbol of promise and divine blessing, while the family scene represents the ultimate achievement of emotional contentment. The flowing river suggests that emotions are moving freely and naturally, and the distant home signifies domestic stability and security.

Unlike the Seven of Cups, where cups float in clouds representing fantasy and illusion, the Ten of Cups places its cups in a rainbow –a phenomenon that is real but fleeting, suggesting that perfect happiness is achievable but must be appreciated in the present moment.

== Divination usage ==
The divinatory message of the Ten of Cups represents fortunate marriage, contentment of the heart, and the perfection of human love and friendship. It can also refer to the town or country where the querent lives. Reversed, it can refer to quarreling, violence, and a troubled heart.

Other divinatory meanings include a peaceful environment and, when reversed, a disrupted routine and selfish exploitation.

Within some esoteric disciplines, such as the Order of the Golden Dawn, each of the forty pip cards of the Tarot deck is assigned and attributed to one of the four letters of the tetragrammaton and one of the ten sephiroth of the Tree of Life. In the case of the Ten of Cups, this attribution is to the tenth sephirah of Malkuth and the letter ה (Heh). The correlation between the two terms in this combination leads to a symbolic title for each card. In the case of this card, that key name is Perpetual success.

== Interpretation ==
=== Upright ===
In an upright position, the Ten of Cups signifies emotional fulfillment at its highest level — lasting happiness, family harmony, joyful relationships, and the realization of one's deepest emotional desires. It frequently appears when a querent is experiencing or approaching a period of domestic bliss and genuine contentment. The card suggests that true wealth is found not in material possessions but in love, connection, and belonging.

In relationship readings, the Ten of Cups is one of the strongest indicators of a happy, committed partnership. It may point to marriage, family milestones, or simply a period where love flows freely between partners. For singles, the card suggests that the emotional fulfillment they seek is approaching.

=== Reversed ===
When reversed, the Ten of Cups can indicate family discord, broken homes, or the disruption of domestic peace. It may suggest that the idealized vision of happiness is being undermined by unresolved conflicts, misaligned values, or unrealistic expectations. A family or relationship may appear happy on the surface while harboring deeper issues that need honest communication to resolve. The reversed card can also point to feelings of isolation within a family unit or the disappointment that comes when reality fails to match one's vision of a perfect life.

== Rider–Waite symbolism ==
- The image appears remarkably idyllic and rustic, representing a pastoral ideal of family happiness.
- Besides the Seven of Cups, this is the only card in the suit where the cups are up in the air and not physically supported. This may show contentment which is not based on material circumstance, or a lack of material consideration.
- The rainbow connects the earthly family scene to the spiritual promise of the cups above, bridging the material and emotional worlds.
- The two children playing freely represent innocence, the next generation, and the continuation of familial love.
