= Four of Cups =

Tarot card of the Minor Arcana

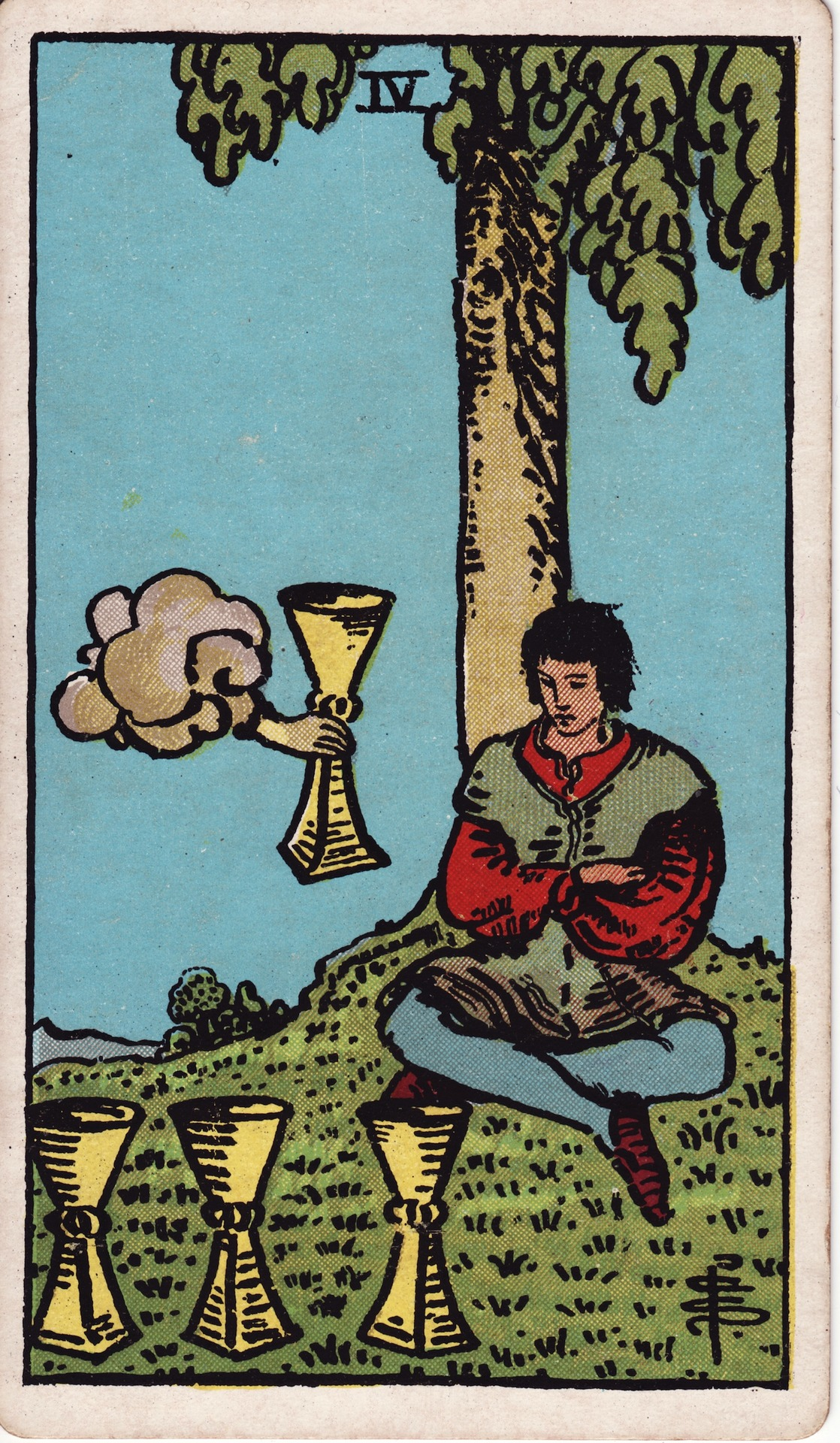
Four of Cups from the Rider–Waite tarot deck

The Four of Cups is a Minor Arcana tarot card. It is associated with the element of Water and is the fourth card in the Suit of Cups. Tarot cards are used throughout much of Europe to play tarot card games. In English-speaking countries, where the games are largely unknown, tarot cards came to be utilized primarily for divinatory purposes.

== Symbolism ==
In Tarot reading, the Four of Cups tends to represent an apathy, disinterest, or contemplation that is misaligned. In the image, the character is sitting in consideration over the cups before them, but is oblivious to the cup being offered. It shows a lack of appreciation for gifts and opportunities. Dismissiveness, complacency, and a lack of growth are being warned against.

In the Rider–Waite depiction, a young man sits cross-legged beneath a tree with his arms folded, gazing at three cups on the ground before him. A fourth cup is being offered by a mysterious hand emerging from a cloud, but he appears too absorbed in his own thoughts to notice it. The tree symbolizes stability and grounding, while the crossed arms suggest emotional closure or defensiveness.

== Interpretation ==
=== Upright ===
In an upright position, the Four of Cups suggests emotional withdrawal, boredom, or dissatisfaction with one's current circumstances. The querent may be so focused inward that they fail to notice new opportunities or emotional connections being presented to them. It can also indicate a period of meditation or self-reflection that, while necessary, has gone on too long and become stagnation.

In readings related to love, the card may suggest taking a partner for granted or feeling emotionally unfulfilled despite having a stable relationship. In career contexts, it can point to disengagement from work or overlooking a promising opportunity.

=== Reversed ===
When reversed, the Four of Cups can indicate a renewed sense of awareness and the acceptance of a previously ignored offer. The querent may be emerging from a period of apathy and beginning to re-engage with the world around them. It suggests a willingness to explore new possibilities and a shift from inward contemplation to outward action.

== In popular culture ==
The themes of the Four of Cups—missed opportunities due to self-absorption—have been referenced in various works exploring existentialism and emotional detachment in modern life.
