= Five of Cups =

Tarot card of the Minor Arcana

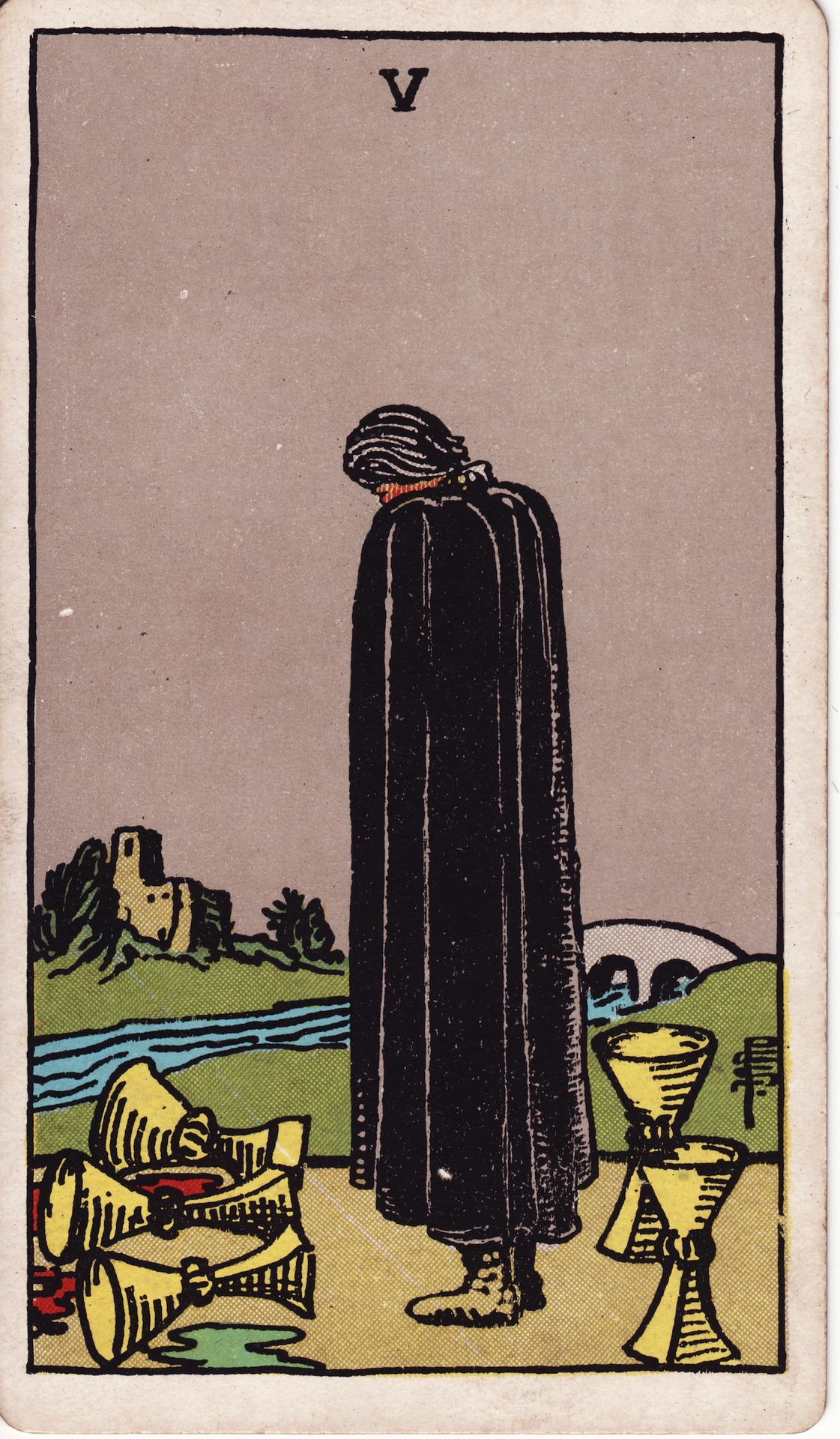
Five of Cups from the Rider–Waite tarot deck

The Five of Cups is a Minor Arcana tarot card.

Tarot cards are used throughout much of Europe to play tarot card games. In English-speaking countries, where the games are largely unknown, tarot cards came to be utilized primarily for divinatory purposes.

== Meanings and interpretations ==
The Five of Cups is related to the Water (🜄) element, planet Mars (♂), and Scorpio.

This card can carry a meaning of dejection, disappointment and sorrow over past events. It can also represent a blindness to good in a given situation. Although the person wearing a black cloak pictured on the card has lost three cups, two still stand, and they failed to appreciate what is left. A river flows under a bridge leading to a safe destination, and yet they focus on their three lost cups.

=== Symbols ===
- Spilled Cups – Lost happiness and disappointments
- Black Cloak – Isolation and grief
- Standing Cups – Remaining opportunities and support
- Bridge – A path forward beyond grief

=== Upright ===
The key meanings of the tarot card Five of Cups:

- Loss
- Grief
- Regret
- Sadness
- Dwelling on the past

=== Reversed ===
The key meanings of Five of Cups, if reversed are:

- Hope
- Acceptance
- Recovery
- Moving forward
