= Eight of Cups =

Tarot card of the Minor Arcana

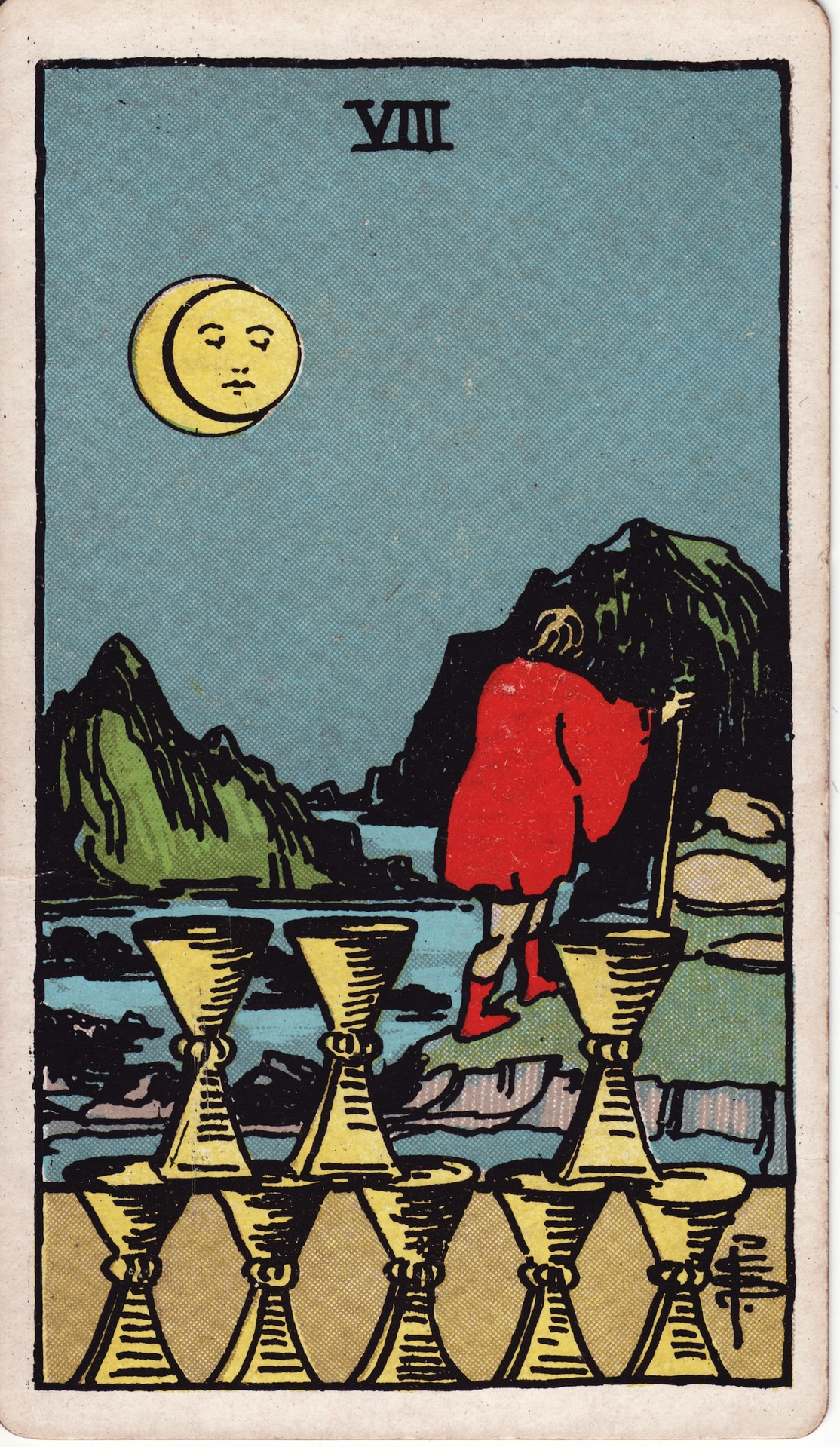
Eight of Cups from the Rider–Waite tarot deck

The Eight of Cups is a card used in Latin-suited playing cards, which include tarot decks. It is part of what tarot card readers call the "Minor Arcana". Tarot cards are used throughout much of Europe to play tarot card games. In English-speaking countries, where the games are largely unknown, tarot cards came to be utilized primarily for divinatory purposes.

This card indicates changes in emotional attachments, departures, and breaking of links with the past. This card usually carries the meaning of disillusionment and abandonment of things which have not been emotionally fulfilling. It features a man wearing a red cloak with a staff walking on rocky terrain, as if walking away from the viewer, eight cups stacked on the ground, with the moon in the sky.
