= Knight of Cups =

Tarot card of the Minor Arcana

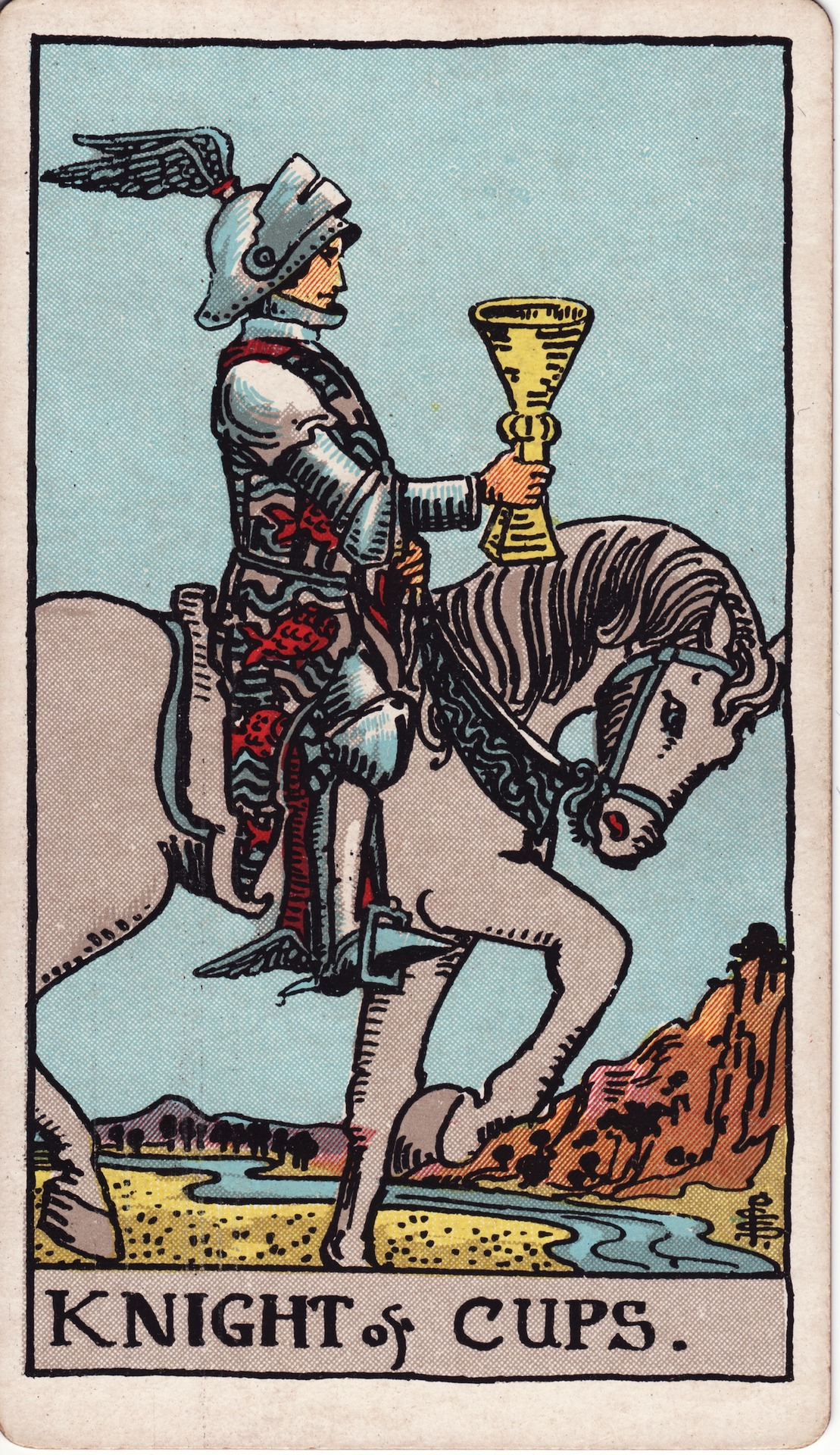
Knight of Cups from the Rider–Waite tarot deck

The Knight of Cups is a card used in Latin-suited playing cards, including tarot decks. It is part of what tarot card readers call the "Minor Arcana".

Tarot cards are used throughout much of Europe to play tarot card games. In English-speaking countries, where the games are largely unknown, tarot cards came to be utilized primarily for divinatory purposes.

== Divination usage ==
If the card is upright, it represents change and new excitements, particularly of a romantic nature. It can mean invitations, opportunities, and offers. The knight of cups is a person who is a bringer of ideas, opportunities and offers. He is constantly bored, and in constant need of stimulation, but also artistic and refined. He represents a person who is amiable, intelligent, and full of high principles, but a dreamer who can be easily persuaded or discouraged.

Reversed, the card represents unreliability and recklessness. It indicates fraud, false promises and trickery. It represents a person who has trouble discerning when and where the truth ends and lies begin.
