= Six of Cups =

Tarot card of the Minor Arcana

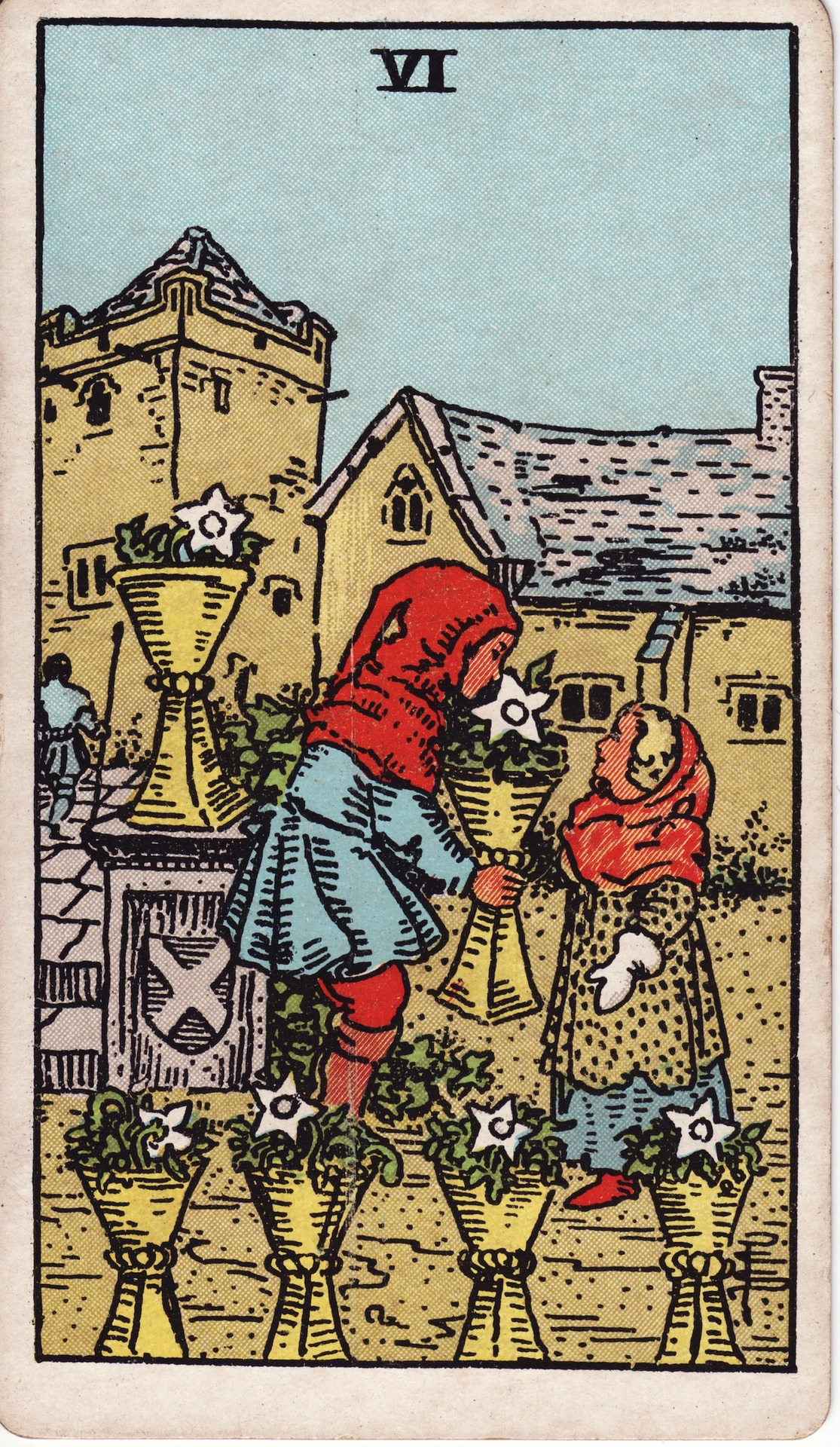
Six of Cups from the Rider–Waite tarot deck

The Six of Cups is a Minor Arcana tarot card.

Tarot cards are used throughout much of Europe to play tarot card games. In English-speaking countries, where the games are largely unknown, tarot cards came to be utilized primarily for divinatory purposes.

== Description ==
The Six of Cups card in the Rider-Waite-Smith deck evokes the idea of nostalgia, and the joys of childhood. It shows two children surrounded by cups, with one handing a cup to the other. Unlike other cards in the suit, these cups are filled with lilies, symbolising purity and innocence. An adult figure walks in the background, further suggesting the distance between the past and present. Enclosing the scene are castle walls, symbolizing comfort and safety.

== Divination usage ==
Interpretations of the card's meaning can vary depending on the deck, but in general the Six of Cups suggests that the querent is currently nostalgic for something in the past, or has encountered something from their past. If this card is drawn in a warning, it can mean that now is not the time to dwell on the past. As an instruction, it means you should let yourself be inspired by memories, and pursue old ambitions. The Crowley Tarot puts emphasis on the idea of enjoying life, and taking joy in nostalgia.
