= King of Cups =

Tarot card of the Minor Arcana

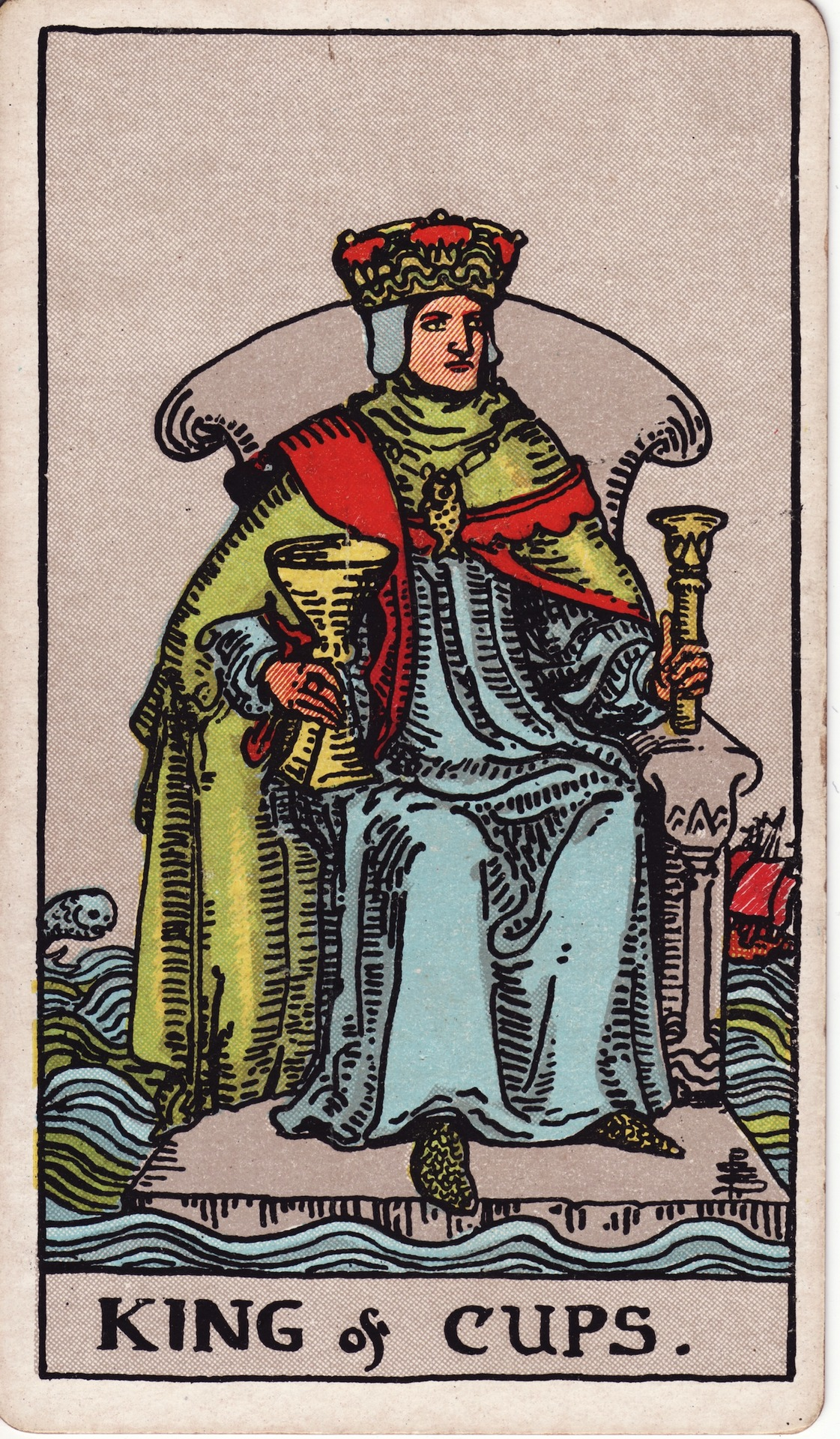
King of Cups from the Rider–Waite tarot deck

The King of Cups is a card used in suited playing cards, which include tarot decks. It is part of what esotericists call the Minor Arcana. The King of Cups is associated with the element of Water and represents emotional mastery, diplomatic wisdom, and compassionate leadership.

Tarot cards are used throughout much of Europe to play tarot card games. In English-speaking countries, where the games are largely unknown, tarot cards came to be utilized primarily for divinatory purposes.

== Symbolism ==
In the Rider–Waite depiction, the King of Cups sits on a stone throne that floats upon a turbulent sea. He wears a blue tunic over a yellow robe and holds a golden chalice in his right hand and a short scepter in his left. A small fish leaps from the ocean on one side, while a ship sails on the other side in the background. The King's calm posture atop the churning sea symbolizes his ability to remain emotionally balanced even when surrounded by turmoil — he does not suppress emotions but rather masters them.

The fish jumping from the water represents the emergence of creativity and unconscious insights into conscious awareness. The ship in the background symbolizes the journeys of imagination and emotional experience that the King has navigated throughout his life. His throne floating directly on the ocean, rather than being set on solid ground, emphasizes that his authority derives from emotional depth rather than material power.

== Divinatory usage ==
The King of Cups card usually depicts a mature man who appreciates the finer things in life such as music and art. He can be warm-hearted and kind. The divinatory message of the card is of a fair-haired man or one associated with art or law. It may also represent a man who is favorably disposed towards the querent or, in a more abstract sense, refer to the arts and sciences or any sphere which involves creative intelligence.

The personality of the King of Cups is a combination of the positive, nurturing water energy of the suit of cups and the active, outward focus of a king. The King of Cups can be a wonderful guide and mentor as he is usually a giver of unselfish aid, albeit one who is easily angered. He cares about others sincerely and always responds to their needs with compassion. He heals with a gentle touch and a quiet word. He is usually tolerant of all points of view and shows patience in the most trying of circumstances.

The King of Cups believes in using diplomacy rather than force, but can be tiresomely devious if crossed, as he is usually big on emotionality. The King of Cups almost always represents a good mentor for a querent who is actively involved in the creative arts.

== Interpretation ==
=== Upright ===
In an upright position, the King of Cups represents emotional balance, diplomatic wisdom, calm authority, and mature compassion. He signifies a person who has achieved mastery over their emotional life — not by suppressing feelings but by understanding and channeling them constructively. In readings, this card often points to the need for measured, compassionate responses rather than reactive or impulsive behavior.

In love readings, the King of Cups represents a deeply devoted and emotionally mature partner who navigates relationship challenges with patience and wisdom. He offers steady, reliable love that is grounded in genuine understanding rather than fleeting passion.

=== Reversed ===
When reversed, the King of Cups may indicate emotional manipulation, suppressed volatility beneath a calm exterior, or the misuse of emotional intelligence for personal advantage. The reversed King can represent someone who weaponizes their understanding of others' feelings, using empathy as a tool for control rather than connection. Alternatively, it may point to emotional withdrawal, coldness, or the inability to process difficult feelings in a healthy manner.

The reversed position can also suggest that someone who is normally emotionally balanced has been pushed past their limits and is struggling to maintain composure under extreme pressure.
