= Page of Cups =

Tarot card of the Minor Arcana

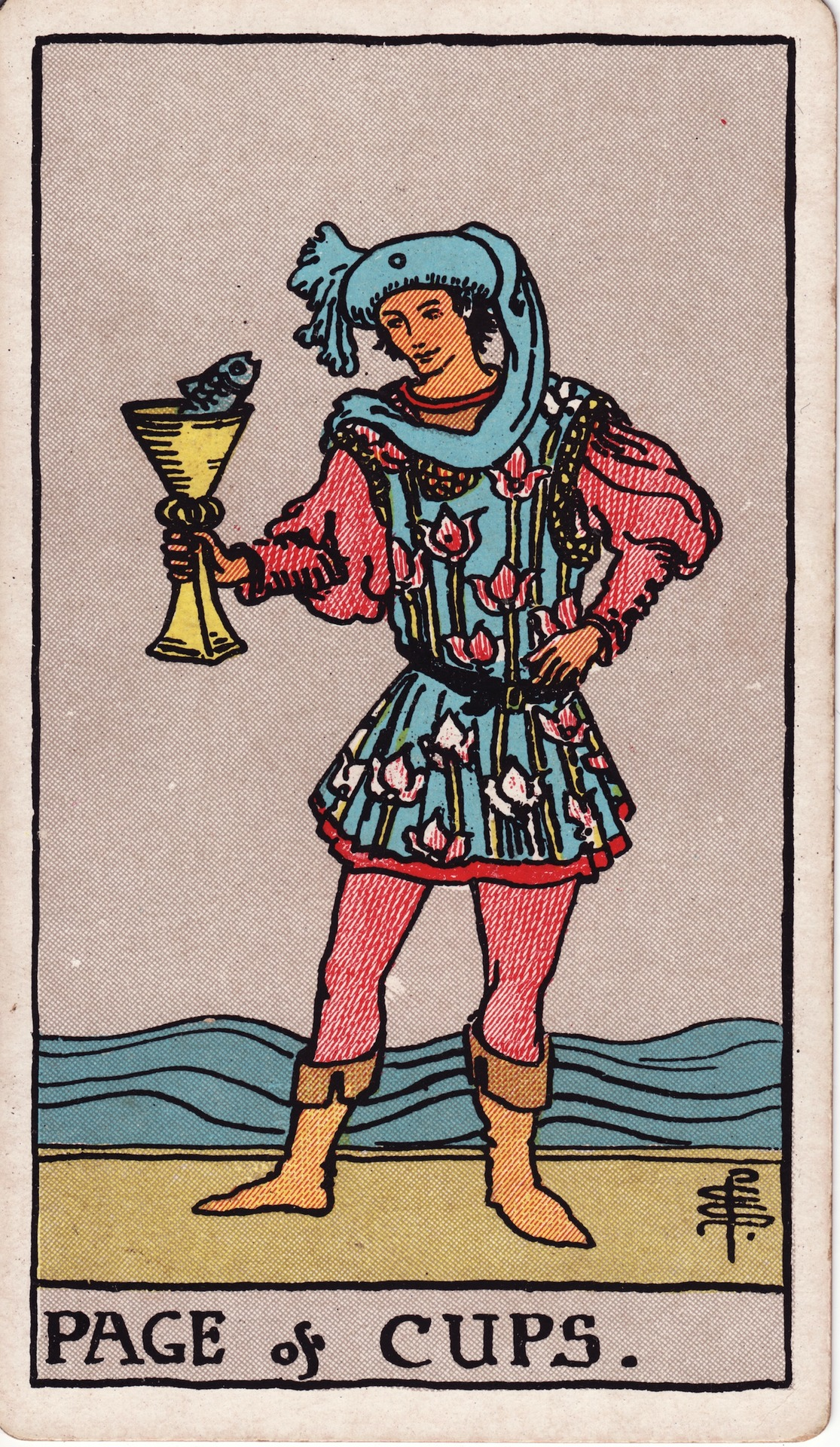
Page of Cups from the Rider–Waite tarot deck

The Page of Cups (or jack or knave of cups or goblets or vessels) is a card used in Latin-suited playing cards which include tarot decks. It is part of what tarot card readers call the "Minor Arcana".

Tarot cards are used throughout much of Europe to play tarot card games. In English-speaking countries, where the games are largely unknown, tarot cards came to be utilized primarily for divinatory purposes.

== Divination usage ==
This card can represent a sweet-natured child who loves home life and family but may struggle in school. This child enjoys the arts and is very spiritual. This child is considered to be a dreamer. The child may be psychic. Often depicted as a child because of their symbolism of optimism and growth. With the child's less serious approach to life, they attract happiness.

This page has a powerful imagination and intuition, as well. Creativity and vision are among this person's blessings. The page's positive outlook often creates great opportunity and results. This card is centered on emotion and opening up those emotions to allow compassion and love for others.

As a situation it represents an opportunity for artistic or creative learning and expansion. Often used to bring new opportunities for relationships.

Known to bring good news. Reveals emotional, intimate, and spiritual needs of a person.

== Key meanings ==
The key meanings of the tarot card Page of Cups:

- Announcement
- Birth
- Creative ideas
- Good news
- Message

When this card is drawn, the message indicates hope and positive change. The message is an announcement that you are on the right path. A person from the past may be bearing a specific message for you. Traditionally, this new message is often brought by a person that is younger than you. This message reveals a positive change that may indicate fertility or new creative ideas.

This card encourages love, laughter, and positivity. There is an appreciation for expressing emotions freely. This card can create new creative ideas and reveal artistic qualities. Listening to your body mentally, physically, and spiritually is a key element to this card.

Regarding emotional struggles, this card calls for the need to express love deeper. When the love becomes deeper, you become more aligned with your life path.

Drawing this card identifies that good news is on the way.

The past meaning for this card indicates awareness of past challenges and how those challenges were overcome. The present meaning for this card reveals the positivity in life and the new message that awaits. The future meaning for this card shows the opportunity that must be taken and ways to heal with previous emotional issues. This card is optimistic in nature, therefore, drawing this card will likely provide great enthusiasm and exciting opportunities.

== Symbols ==
The Page of Cups is related to the Earth (🜃) and Water (🜄) elements.

The symbols of the Page of Cups indicate:

- The page is holding a cup with a blue fish inside that indicates creativity and emotion.
- The monochromatic blue color throughout the card indicates a message of communication.
- The water lilies on the page's clothes indicate happiness, growth, and beauty.
- The feather that the page is wearing reveals spiritual awakenings and reward for their wisdom and communication.
- The waves behind the page indicate waves of emotion.
- The page is considered young which symbolize optimism and opportunity.

== Reversed meaning ==
Reversed meaning of the Page of Cups reveals:

- Bad news
- Immaturity or emotional instability/breakdown; mood swings
- Disappointments regarding intimate or platonic relationships
- Indulging in harmful addictions (e.g. alcohol or smoking abuse)
- Neglectful of important matters
- Seeking attention
- Canceled events and trips
- Obsession
- Lack of inspiration

Reversed meanings reveals negative consequences but acts as caution. The reversed meaning is intended to be seen as guidance to create a more positive outcome, which includes reconnection with original intentions.

== In popular culture ==
- "Page of Cups" is an instrumental on the 2003 album Voyageur by electronic music project Enigma.
