= Seven of Cups =

Tarot card of the Minor Arcana

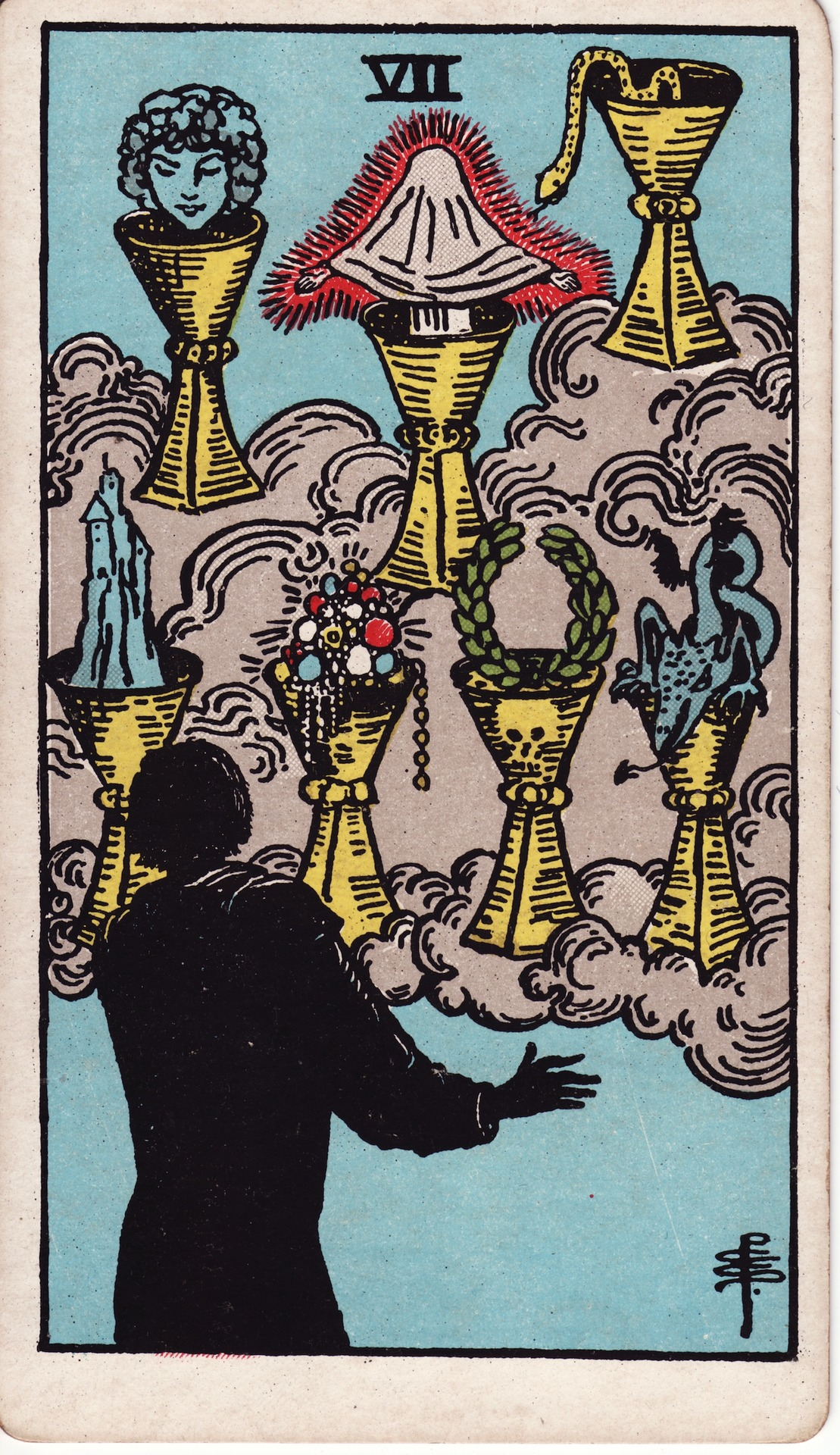
Seven of cups from the Rider–Waite tarot deck

The Seven of Cups is a Minor Arcana tarot card in the suit of cups. This single card is a part of the popularized tarot deck used for the practice of tarot card readings, often seen under the practice of occult and fortune telling. One of the more well-known illustrations, encapsulating a variety of symbols, is by the artist Pamela Colman Smith. What the card represents is subjective to the individual, but has a speculative meaning that has been agreed upon by the generalized tarot community.

== General history ==
Tarot playing cards appeared in history in Italy during the fifteenth century. Tarot was developed further in Britain during the late 1880s to the 1930s, with Arthur Edward Waite being one of the key figures in the development of the tarot deck. Waite was a British poet and scholar who wrote considerably on occult and esoteric subjects, leading him to co-create the Rider-Waite tarot deck. He would often draw from ideas of folklore and cultural studies in order to engage with interpretations and practices of the cards. Though influence was taken from Arthurian Literature and Celtic myth, he also revised the imagery based on his own theories and interpretations. Eventually, these developments of the cards, with the illustrations by Pamela Colman Smith, were published as a newer version of the deck in 1910. To this day, this deck still remains well-known and recognized amongst tarot users.

A.E. Waite, in one of his publications, The Key to the Tarot: Being Fragments of a Secret Tradition under the Veil of Divination, which was published in 1986, delves into the interpretations of each card. For the Seven of Cups, he describes it as showing different moments of vision. Divinity meanings could include gaining favors, moments of reflection, a newfound view of a situation, imagination, or seeing new confirmations in a situation.

== Rider–Waite symbolism ==
Arthur Edward Waite describes these cups as strange chalices of vision. The illustration places the seven cups on a cloud, possibly reflecting their impractical or transient nature. This may also reflect the idealized imagination or confusion of the figure conjuring them. Accordingly, the cups have been associated with wishful thinking.

There is some dispute as to what the 7 symbols in the cups mean, with the exact elements of this vision being less important than the very act of conjuring them.

Each cup seems to offer:

- A human head – might be in reference to Medusa within Greek Mythology.
- A shrouded, glowing figurine – may represent the higher self.
- A snake – these animals can sometimes represent renewal and development as they frequently shed their skin.
- A castle or tower
- A treasure hoard
- A laurel wreath – the cup holding it has an image of a skull, may represent consequenses beneath victories.
- A dragon – represents the ruler of all elements (fire, water, earth, & air); can represent a ruler who has power that has existed since the beginning of time.

== Reversed ==
According to A.E. Waite, if the Seven of Cups occurs in a reversed format, it may represent a sense of desire for a certain outcome, the determination and will to gain an outcome of a situation, or some kind of project presenting itself.
