= Two of Cups =

Tarot card of the Minor Arcana

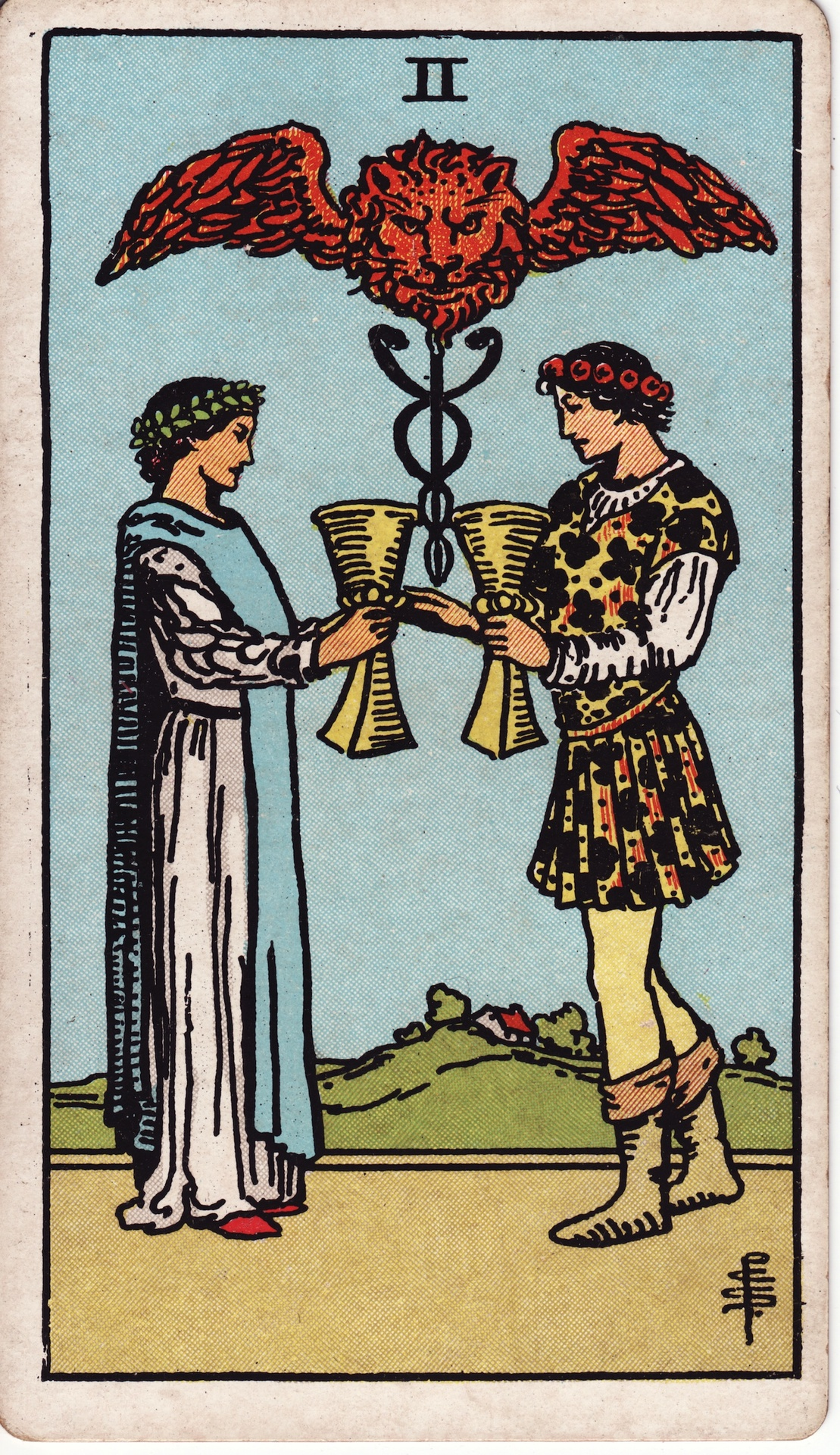
Two of Cups from the Rider–Waite tarot deck

Two of Cups is a Minor Arcana tarot card. Tarot cards are used throughout much of Europe to play tarot card games. In English-speaking countries, where the games are largely unknown, tarot cards came to be utilized primarily for divinatory purposes.

== Divination usage ==
The card shows a man and a woman staring into each other's eyes, sharing their emotions by way of the cups. Wings and snakes form a Caduceus, and with the lion head present, the elements are similar to the Chimera and suggest danger or heroism in the transaction.

There is romance between them, a sexual attraction. The Two of Cups shows power that is created when two come together. This is the card that lovers want to see, for the Two of Cups is the minor arcana equivalent of the Lovers in many ways. The Two of Cups has a deeper meaning as well. Whenever two forces are drawn together, there is the potential for bonding. This card can stand for the union of any two entities - people, groups, ideas, or talents. In readings, the Two of Cups tells you to look for connections in your life, especially those that are one-on-one. Now is not the time to separate or stay apart. It is the time to join with another and work as a partnership. If you are in conflict, look for truce and the chance to forgive and be forgiven. If you are struggling with two choices or tendencies within yourself, seek to reconcile them.

Usually, the Two of Cups is welcome in a reading, but it can also sound a note of warning. The energy of Two can be very compelling. They create between themselves a world of their own that can feel exclusionary to outsiders. "Two's company; three's a crowd." Make sure that the tendency to pair off is not creating disharmony in your situation.

Description: Partnerships and unions are represented by the Two of Cups. Much like the Lovers card in the Major Arcana, energies come together to create a mutual bond. Beauty, power, and electric vibrations occur, bringing romance and sexual energy to the scene. Platonic relationships also benefit from the Two of Cups. This is the card that signifies reconciliation. Struggles come to an end, and harmony is restored to even the most hostile of relationships. Inner conflicts also come into play when this card appears. An inner peace is created. Expect to feel strongly connected to others, but also to other entities that bring two together like ideas or talents. Reversed, this card indicates that pairing off to the exclusion of all other people and situations is happening. Take the time to bring balance into life by including other factors. Unhealthy relationships that consume all one's energy need to be examined, and a new course of action decided upon.
