= Tarocco =

Tarocco may refer to:

- Tarocco, a Renaissance card game using tarot cards
- Tarocco Piemontese, a type of tarot deck used to play a surviving variant of the game
- Tarocco Bolognese, a type of tarot deck used to play Tarocchini, another surviving variant popular in Bologna
- Tarocco Siciliano, a type of tarot deck found in Sicily
- An Italian variant cultivar of the Blood orange
