= Tarocco Siciliano =

Tarot card deck

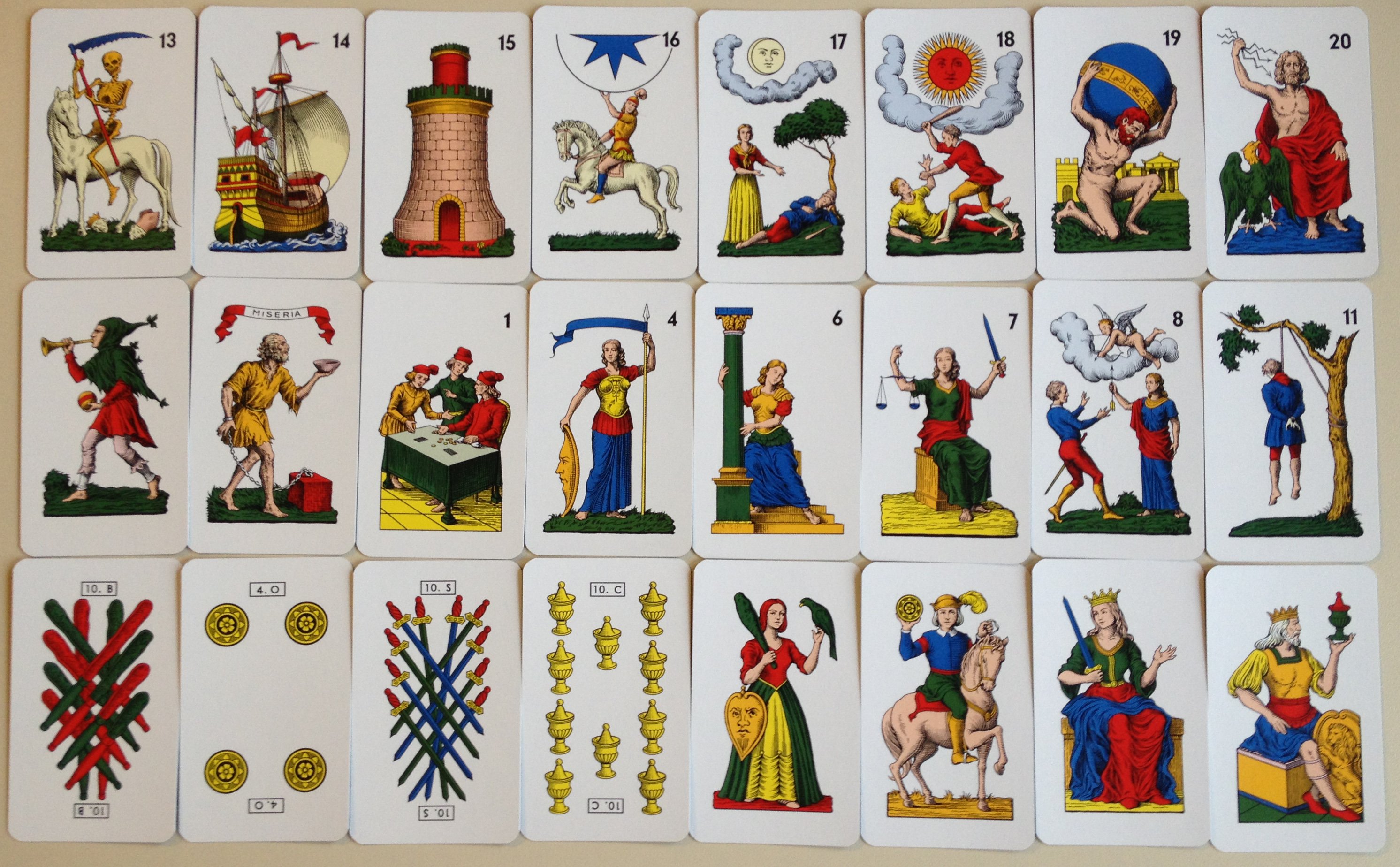
Tarocco Siciliano cards by Modiano.

The Tarocco Siciliano is a tarot deck found in Sicily and is used to play Sicilian tarocchi. It is one of the three traditional Latin-suited tarot decks still used for games in Italy, the others being the more prevalent Tarocco Piemontese and the Tarocco Bolognese. The deck was heavily influenced by the Tarocco Bolognese and the Minchiate. It is also the only surviving tarot deck to use the Portuguese variation of the Latin suits of cups, coins, swords, and clubs which died out in the late 19th and early 20th centuries.

== Design ==
=== Suits ===
Tarot decks were produced in Palermo before 1630. The deck was shortened from 78 cards during the 18th century. The Tarocco Siciliano currently uses 63 cards, one more than the Tarocco Bolognese. Despite this, the pack is sold with one unneeded card, the 1 of Coins, which was used to bear the stamp tax (the only game that uses this 64th card is the four-handed version played in Barcellona Pozzo di Gotto where it ranks as the lowest in the suit of Coins). The pip cards contain ranks 5 to 10 with the coins also having a 4. Like modern French tarot, but unlike all other tarot games, the pip cards of all suits rank in progressive order.

Suit Tarocco Siciliano
Suit				
(United Kingdom)	Swords	Cups	Coins	Clubs
(Italy)	Spade	Coppe	Denari	Bastoni
(Spain)	Espadas	Copas	Oros	Bastos

Unlike the northern Piemontese and Bolognese tarocchi decks which use Italian suits of smooth batons and curved swords, the Siciliano uses Spanish pips of knobbly cudgels and straight swords like other southern Italian decks. The Siciliano depicts these suits like the extinct Portuguese pattern by the intersecting of the swords and clubs. The Minchiate as well as the extinct decks of the Papal States and the Kingdom of Naples had the same feature.

This deck is known for its distinctly female knaves (donne) that are sometimes referred to as maids. While some decks in southern Italy sometimes include female or androgynous knaves, the Tarocco Siciliano knaves are unambiguously and consistently women. This was a feature found in the Portuguese pattern. Since a Latin tarot deck also includes queens, this is the only traditional playing card deck to include two ranks of women to have survived into the present. The Minchiate deck had half of its knaves female while the Cary-Yale tarot set had three ranks of women per suit.

=== Trumps ===
Some portraits of the trumps borrow from the Minchiate while others are unique or altered, such as the Hanged Man who is now hanged by his neck instead of by his foot. All trumps use corner indices with modern Arabic numerals from 1 to 20 with the exception of Miseria, which ranks below trump 1. Miseria, depicted by a chained beggar, is not considered a valuable card. The face cards and the Fugitive (the Fool) are unnumbered and unlabelled. Unlike other tarot games, the Fugitive cannot lead a trick unless it is the last trick. The deck is single-faced and not reversible. Pip cards use centered indices in common with Portuguese-suited decks.

Players do not use the names of trumps 2 to 15, they refer to them by number. Of these cards, only the names of trumps 4, 14, and 15 are known through historical sources, the rest have been lost. The order of trumps from highest to lowest is as follows:

No.	Label	Translation	Notes
20	Giove	Jupiter (Note: The highest trump, both here and in da Tortona's pack. Swiss Tarot and Tarot de Besançon feature Jupiter instead of the Pope, while the Sola Busca deck has his Greek equivalent, Zeus, seated on a chariot. Boiardo–Viti has him among its face cards, featuring his eagle on a similar position (XVIII).) (Jove)	Jupiter instead of an angel casting judgement
19	Atlante; Palla	Atlas; Globe	Atlas supporting the globe
18	Sole	Sun	Two men fighting (Note: The nativity story, along with other biblical and classical myths, like those of Cain and Abel or Remus and Romulus, were quite popular during the Middle Ages, being also depicted in Renaissance art.) under the Sun
17	Luna	Moon	A couple under the Moon
16	Stella	Star	Horseman under a star, like in the Minchiate
15	Torre	Tower (Note: Depicted as a lighthouse, (Note: Seafaring historically represented one of Sicily's main activities.) its beacon replacing the destructive thunderbolt.) (Note: The ship and the tower lighting its path occupy consecutive positions.)	Tower is intact, no disaster
14	Vascello	Ship (Note: Death and the ship occupy consecutive positions; see Charon.)	From Minchiate trump XXI
13		Death (Note: Depicted riding a horse in all Italian tarots, save for Tarocco Piemontese.)	
12		Time (Note: Bears the same name in the Minchiate.)	
11		Hanged Man	Hanged from the neck, not tied to a post
10		Wheel (Note: The Wheel and The Chariot also occupy consecutive positions in the Minchiate.)	
9		Chariot	
8		Love	
7		Justice (Note: The three cardinal virtues occupy consecutive positions in all Italian tarots, save for Tarocco Piemontese.)	
6		Fortitude	
5		Temperance	
4	Constanza	Constancy (Note: Depicted flying a flag in the air, steady or constant winds being necessary for sailing. Envisioned as a fourth virtue, complementing or accompanying those occupying the following three positions, and replacing another female figure, The Popess.)	Unique to this deck, formerly had a caption
3		Emperor (Note: The medieval Boiardo–Viti and da Tortona decks also feature a (single) royal couple on the previous position (I and II), while all other non-Belgian tarots contain two such pairs.)	
2		Empress	
1	Bagotti; Picciotti	Mountebank; Young Man	
(0)	Miseria; Poverta	Destitution; Poverty (Note: Depicted as a beggar, replacing another male figure, The Pope, Southern Italy's harsh Mediterranean climate, unfavorable to agriculture, contributing to the region's chronic poverty.)	Unique to this deck, only one with a caption

Trumps 1, 20, and the Fool are worth 10 points. The five highest trumps, 16 to 19, are collectively known as the arie (airs), as in the Minchiate, being worth 5 points each, along with the kings, while queens, knights, and maids are worth 4, 3, and 2 points, respectively.

Tarot decks are often just expanded versions of local standard decks but this deck is not related to the standard 40-card Sicilian pack which has a separate origin. Their cards are not interchangeable.
