= Minchiate =

Early 16th century Italian card game

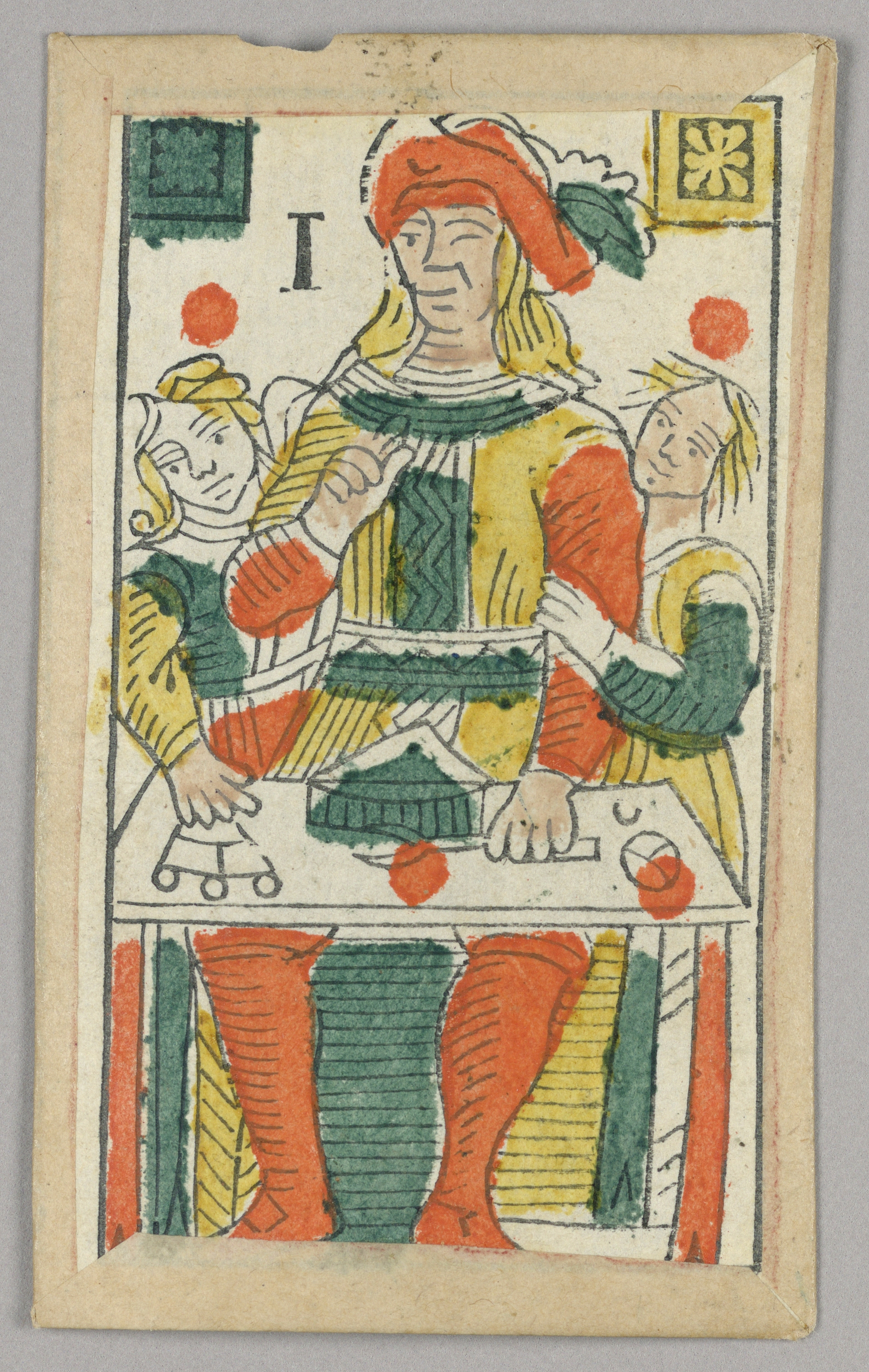
- Trump I, Ganellino from Earlier Minchiate
- Origin: Florence
- Alternative names: Germini, Gallerini, Ganellini
- Type: Trick-taking
- Players: 2-4
- Skills: Tactics, Strategy, Cooperation
- Cards: 97
- Rank (high→low): Trump suit 40-1; Long suits: K Q C J 10 9 8 7 6 5 4 3 2 1 Round suits: K Q C J 1 2 3 4 5 6 7 8 9 10
- Play: Counter-clockwise
- Playing time: 30 min.
- Chance: Moderate

Related games
- Tarocchini

Minchiate, also known as Germini or Tarocchi fiorentini (Florentine tarot), is an early 16th-century card game, originating in Florence, Italy. It is no longer widely played. The term can also refer to the special deck of 97 playing cards used in the game. The deck is similar to the conventional tarot cards, but contains an expanded suit of trumps. The game was similar to but more complex than tarocchi. The minchiate represents a Florentine variant on the original game.

== History ==
Florence is one of the contenders for the birthplace of tarot. The earliest reference to tarot cards, then known as trionfi, is dated to 1440 when a notary in Florence recorded the transfer of two decks to Sigismondo Pandolfo Malatesta.

The word minchiate comes from a dialect word meaning "nonsense" or "trifle", derived from mencla, the vulgar form of mentula, a Latin word for "phallus". The word minchione is attested in Italian as meaning "fool", and minchionare means "to laugh at" someone. The intended meaning may be "the game of the fool", considering that the card "The Fool", also called "The Excuse", features prominently in the game play of all tarot games. In tarocchini, sminchiate is a signal used to communicate to a teammate.

The earliest reference to minchiate is found in a 1466 letter by Luigi Pulci to Lorenzo de' Medici. This game was believed to be played by a 78-card deck (Note: The game of tarot historically evolved from the standard 52-card deck, its additional twenty-two trumps and four queens constituting the equivalent of two extra thirteen-card suits, decks with five and six suits, respectively, having already been attested as early as John of Rheinfelden's late 14th century treatise. By contrast, the Florentine minchiate were developed from preexisting tarot packs, whose minor arcana consists of four fourteen-card suits, 98 being among the latter's multiples. Once the Popess was eventually dropped from its ranks, their number became 97. The only other trionfi known to have had a multiple of fourteen as their total number of cards are those belonging to Galeazzo Maria Sforza, but little is known of their composition.) as evidenced by the Rosenwald sheets, uncut sheets of Florentine tarots dated from 1480 to 1500. There are two other differences from 97-card minchiate. First, in 97-card minchiate the sequence for some of the lower trumps goes from lowest to highest: Fortitude, Justice, Wheel, and Chariot. In the Rosenwald ordering it is Justice, Fortitude, Chariot, and Wheel.

Second, the Rosenwald sheets contains the Popess as the second trump, which is not found in the 97-card deck. In a Florentine song written around 1500, the trumps in a tarot deck were listed as almost exactly as the Rosenwald sheets, with the exception of the missing Popess which likely means that this card was dropped from the deck by that time. The song also ranks the other trumps as Fortitude, Justice, Chariot, and Wheel, which suggests it is a transitional stage from the Rosenwald sheets to the 97-card deck's order.

97-card minchiate was first known as germini, after the Gemini (XXXV) card, the highest of the newly introduced trumps. The earliest record of germini dates to 1506. This deck was created by inserting the 20 new trumps as a single block between trump 15 and The Star, which is now trump 36. The new deck proved so much more popular, that the 77-card deck ceased production and the older name of minchiate was transferred over to the larger deck during the 17th century.

The game spread from Florence to the rest of Italy and France during the 1600s. In Sicily, it was called gallerini. In Liguria it was known as ganellini. The rules used in these regions are lost, except for cryptic references that they were quite different from the Florentine game. All surviving rules are derived from the type played in the Grand Duchy of Tuscany and the Papal States.

By the 18th century, minchiate had overtaken the original game of tarot in popularity in Italy. Paolo Minucci published a commentary on the game in 1676. The game is described in detail by Romain Merlin in Origine des cartes à jouer, published in Paris in 1869. It was also known in Germany during the late 18th century. The game was still played in Genoa in the 1930s, but its popularity declined in the late 19th and early 20th century.

== Deck ==
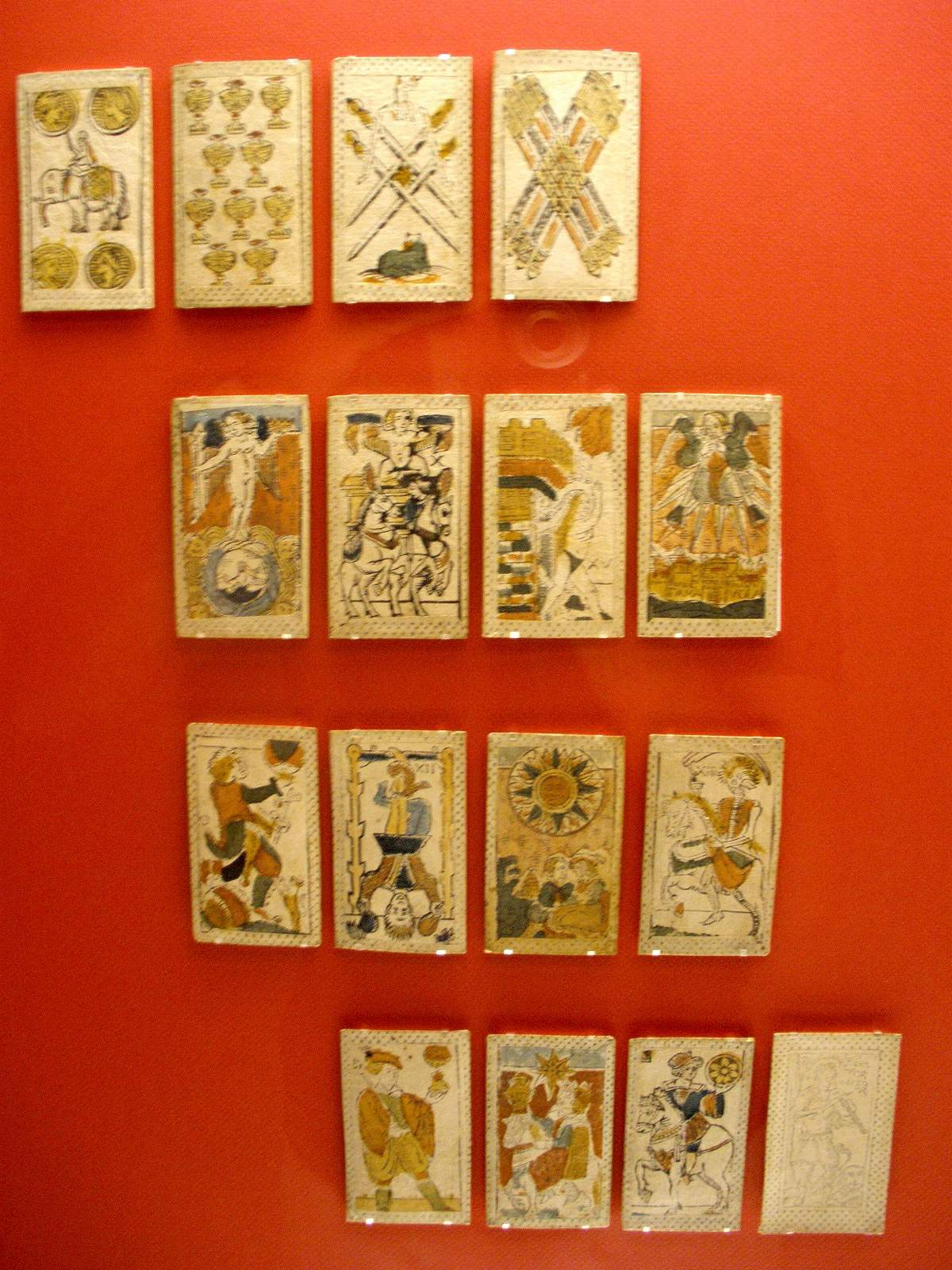
Lucca version cards

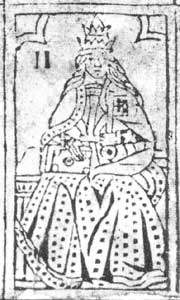
The Popess from the Rosenwald sheet.

The minchiate deck differs from other tarot decks in several features. The first and most obvious difference is that the trumps have almost doubled in number; there are 40 trumps in the minchiate, in addition to the unnumbered card the Madman, The Fool or the excuse. Minchiate uses Roman numerals for its trumps. Due to the large number of trumps, players generally called them by their number with the exception of the arie.

=== Suits ===
Suit Minchiate
Suit				
(United Kingdom)	Swords	Cups	Coins	Clubs
(Italy)	Spade	Coppe	Denari	Bastoni
(Spain)	Espadas	Copas	Oros	Bastos

Minchiate decks come in two standard patterns, earlier and later, which coexisted for almost two centuries. Earlier Minchiate dates from the early 16th century or even the late 15th century. As seen in the table below, there are the four standard Latin suits of swords, clubs, coins, and cups. These contain pip cards from ace to ten, and four face cards: a jack, a knight, a queen, and a king.

In the minchiate deck, in the suits of cups and coins, the "knaves" or "pages" (Italian fanti) have been replaced by "maids" (fantine). The knights, mounted figures in the tarot of Marseilles and similar designs, are centaurs or sphinxes in many minchiate decks. The suits follow the Portuguese pattern, with the exception of the clubs which are depicted as batons which follows from the northern Italian suit-system. This pattern died out around 1900.

Minchiate card deck (1860-1890)
	1	2	3	4	5	6	7	8	9	10	Jack	Knight	Queen	King
Clubs														
Coins														
Cups														
Swords														

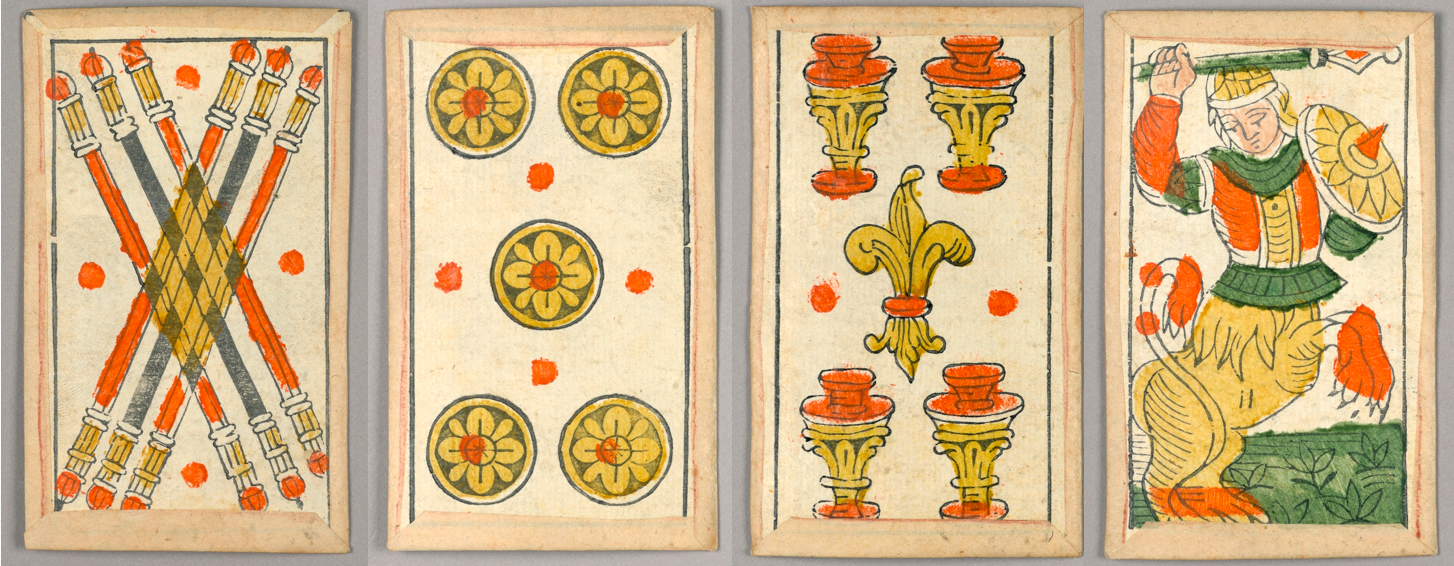
Earlier Minchiate cards, 17th century, from Smithsonian Digital Collections

The Republic of Lucca produced their own version of Minchiate decks which were very similar to the ones used in nearby Florence but with several graphical differences. Kings are seated under arches, knights are humans riding horses, all knaves are male, and the Fool is playing with a dog. This pattern died out in the eighteenth century.

=== Trumps ===
The Later Minchiate pattern appeared around the early 18th century as a luxury edition. In this version, the eight highest trumps lose their red backgrounds. Around 1820, this pattern was redesigned to give it a flatter, plainer appearance with changes to a quarter of the trump and court cards while restoring the red background to the high trumps. This pattern survived in Liguria until the 1930s.

The trumps of the minchiate deck, and their corresponding Tarot of Marseilles and the de Poilly cards are:

The trumps of the minchiate deck
No.	Image	Label	Translation	Corresponding de Poilly card	Corresponding Marseilles card
(0)		Il Matto	The Madman	Momus	Le Mat
The Five Popes
I		Papa Uno; L'Uno; Il Papino; Ganellino	Pope One	(1. Mercure)	I. Le Bateleur The Trivial; Performer
II		Papa Due; L'Imperatrice	Pope Two; The Empress	—N/a	III. L'Impératrice
III		Papa Tre; L'Imperatore	Pope Three; The Emperor	—N/a	IIII. L'Empereur
IIII		Papa Quattro; Il Papa	Pope Four; The Pope	(4. Bacchus)	V. Le Pape
V		Papa Cinque; L'Amore	Pope Five; Love	2. L'Amour; (3. Venus Naiſſante)	VI. L'Amoureux The Lover
The Three Cardinal Virtues
VI		La Temperanza	Temperance (Note: The three cardinal virtues occupy consecutive positions in all Italian tarots, save for Tarocco Piemontese.)	—N/a	XIIII. Temperance
VII		La Fortezza	Fortitude	9. La Force	XI. La Force
VIII		La Giustizia	Justice	7. La Justice	VIII. La Justice
The Midsection
IX		La Ruota della Fortuna	The Wheel (Note: The Wheel and The Chariot also occupy consecutive positions in Tarocco Siciliano.) of Fortune	10. La Fortune	X. La Roue de Fortune
X		Il Carro	The Chariot	—N/a	VII. Le Chariot
XI		Il Gobbo; Il Tempo	The Hunchback; Time (Note: Bears the same name in Tarocco Siciliano.)	11. Les Ages, la Vieillesse; (12. Age Viril) (13. Age Adolescences) (14. Ages l'Enfence)	VIIII. L'Ermite The Hermit
XII		L'Impiccato; Il Traditore	The Hanged Man; The Traitor	—N/a	XII. Le Pendu
XIII		La Morte	Death (Note: Depicted riding a horse in all Italian tarots, save for Tarocco Piemontese.)	—N/a	XIII. (unlabelled)
XIV		Il Diavolo; Il Demonio	The Devil	—N/a	XV. Le Diable
XV		La Casa del Diavolo	The House (Note: Label and imagery suggestive of domestic violence. Visually reminiscent of Adam and Eve, the serpent from their story being traditionally identified with the devil (XIV).) of the Devil	(15. Les Sens, le Gout) (16. Les Sens, le Toucher) (17. Les Sens, l'Odorat) (18. Les Sens, l'Ouye) (19. Les Sens, la Veue)	XVI. La Maison Dieu The House of God
The Four Missing Virtues
XVI		La Speranza	Hope	8. L'Esperence	—N/a
XVII		La Prudenza	Prudence	5. La Prudence	—N/a
XVIII		La Fede	Faith	—N/a	—N/a
XVIIII		La Carità	Charity	6. La Charité	—N/a
The Four Classical Elements
XX		Il Fuoco	Fire	20. Element le Feu	—N/a
XXI		L'Acqua	Water	22. Element l'Eau	—N/a (Note: Tarocco Siciliano features a ship, instead of The Devil.)
XXII		La Terra	Earth	21. Element Terre	—N/a
XXIII		L'Aria	Air	23. Element l'Aire	—N/a
The Twelve Zodiac Signs
XXIIII		La Bilancia	Libra	26. Septembre	—N/a (Note: Scales are featured on all renditions of Justice.)
XXV		La Vergine	Virgo	28. Aoust	—N/a
XXVI		Lo Scorpione	Scorpio	27. Octobre	—N/a
XXVII		L'Ariete	Aries	33. Mars	—N/a
XXVIII		Il Capricorno	Capricorn	24. Decembre	—N/a
XXVIIII		Il Sagittario	Sagittarius	25. Novembre	—N/a
XXX		Il Cancro	Cancer	30. Juin	—N/a (Note: A crab is featured on Marseilles' rendition of The Moon.)
XXXI		I Pesci	Pisces	34. Fevrier	—N/a
XXXII		L'Acquario	Aquarius	35. Janvier	—N/a (Note: A nude water-pouring woman is featured on Marseilles' rendition of The Star.)
XXXIII		Il Leone	Leo	29. Juillet	—N/a (Note: A lion is featured on Marseilles' rendition of Strength.)
XXXIIII		Il Toro	Taurus	32. Avril	—N/a
XXXV		I Gemelli	Gemini	31. May	—N/a (Note: Twins are featured on Marseilles' rendition of The Sun.)
The Five Unnumbered Arie
(XXXVI)		La Stella	The Star	36. Les Etoiles	XVII. L'Étoile
(XXXVII)		La Luna	The Moon	37. La Lune	XVIII. La Lune
(XXXVIII)		Il Sole	The Sun	38. Le Soleil	XVIIII. Le Soleil
(XXXVIIII)		Il Mondo	The World	39. Le Monde	XXI. Le Monde
(XL)		Le Trombe	The Trumpets	40. Le Renommé	XX. Le Jugement

Trump VII, La Fortezza

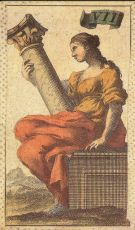
Later Minchiate (18th century)

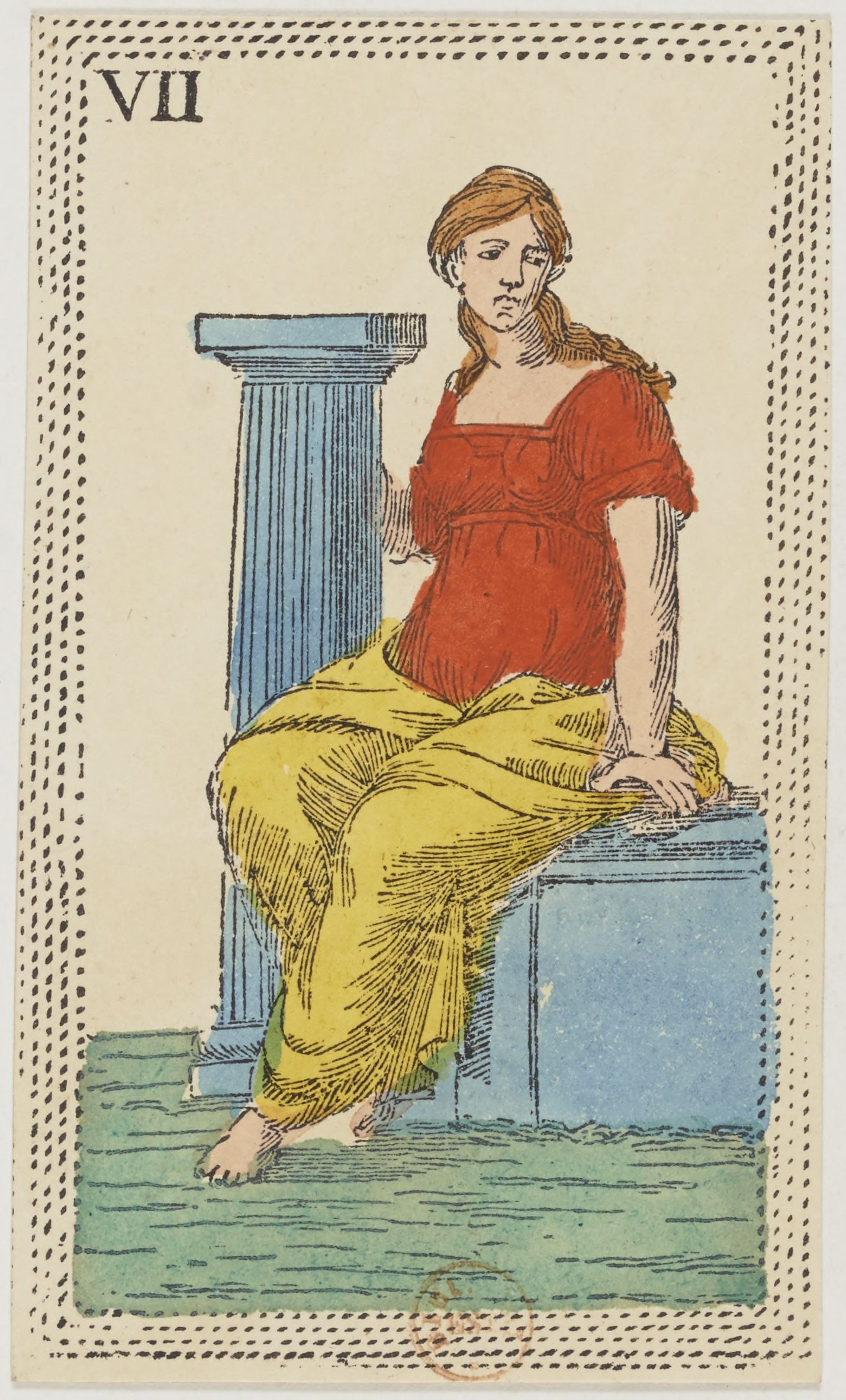
Later Minchiate (19th century)

By comparing the Rosenwald sheet with 16th century trump lists, the Popess (II) was likely dropped in the late 15th century which shifted every trump above the first down one rank. The Empress, Emperor, and Pope became the new II, III, and IIII respectively, the latter now wearing a secular crown as opposed to a papal tiara.

Since the five lowest trumps were collectively known as the papi (popes), Love was added to this group after its demotion. The identification of middle papi was largely forgotten for centuries as players generally called cards by their number (pope 2, pope 3, etc.) French writer Romain Merlin (1869) is the only source that called trumps II, III, and IIII the Grand Duke, Western Emperor, and Eastern Emperor.

Justice, Fortitude, and Temperance were three classical "cardinal virtues" depicted in the more familiar tarot trumps. The minchiate supplies the remaining cardinal virtue — Prudence — and inserts them with the three theological virtues, Faith, Hope and Charity. The only other deck to have the theological virtues was the Cary-Yale deck. This is the only deck to include all seven virtues.

Minchiate is a southern tarot pattern so it shares many qualities with the Bolognese and Sicilian tarots as opposed to the western patterns like the tarot of Marseilles. While the Tower is called The House of God in the Marseilles tarot, it is called the House of the Devil or Hellmouth in the minchiate deck and it depicts a nude woman fleeing a burning building. The Moon depicts an astrologer studying the moon instead of the tarot of Marseilles howling dogs and lobster.

The card corresponding to the Hermit is often called Time, or the Hunchback. It depicts an elderly man on crutches with an hourglass in the background. Like other southern decks, the final card in the series is not the World, but Judgement. The minchiate completes the series by adding all the zodiac signs, in random order, and the four classical elements.

The eight highest ranking trumps have a red background while the top five (the arie) are unnumbered. A 98th card was made for some decks. It is a trump with a red background and is also unnumbered like the arie. It depicts a nude woman running in a wheel, probably representing Fortuna. While 98-card decks were mentioned as being played in Sicily during the early 18th century, only a few examples from Genoa survive. It is uncertain how this card ranked and how it affected the versicole sequences in the game. Also unknown is how it relates to the 98-card version of de Poilly's Minchiate described below.

=== Educational Minchiate ===
Educational decks were produced in Florence during the 18th century. Instead of the usual figures and pips, each card would have text explaining a certain topic. One history deck has each suit teaching the history of Assyria, Persia, Greece, or Rome with the trumps teaching myths and legends. Geography decks contained maps of the known world.

=== De Poilly's packs ===
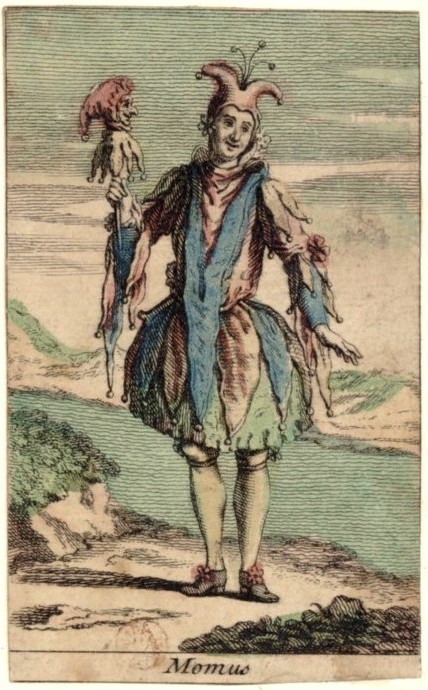
Momus as the Fool in the 97-card deck

French engraver François de Poilly (1623–93) produced a French-suited Minchiate deck in the late 1650s after his return from Italy. Each of the plain suits represent a different continent; spades for Africa, hearts for Europe, clubs for the Americas, and diamonds for Asia. The engravings share motifs with both the Italian Minchiate and the later Tarot Nouveau as well as taking unique motifs from Roman Mythology.

97 cards with 40 trumps and Fool order:

- Momus as the Fool, #1-4 Gods (Mercury, Amor, Venus, Bacchus), #5-9 Virtues (Prudence, Charity, Justice, Hope, Strength), #10 Fortune, #11-14 Ages (Old age, Youth, Adolescence, Infancy), #15-19 Senses (Taste, Touch, Smell, Hearing, Sight), #20-23 Elements (Fire, Earth, Water, Air), #24-35 Months/Zodiac (December/Capricorn, November/Sagittarius, September/Libra, October/Scorpio, August/Virgo, July/Leo, June/Cancer, May/Gemini, April/Taurus, March/Aries, February/Pisces, January/Aquarius), #36-39 Cosmological objects (Star, Moon, Sun, World), #40 Renown/Judgement.

The September and October cards are out of order, apparently in error. The eight highest trumps have a red background just like in the Italian cards. All trumps use Arabic numerals as corner indices while the plain suits lack them.

After his death, his son François (1666-1741), inherited his engravings. He should not be confused with his identically named cousin (1671-1723). Circa 1715-1730, he reused his father's engravings to create a copper-colored monochrome 98-card deck. Possibly out of ignorance of the original game, he rearranged the order of many trumps. Momus is no longer the Fool but a numbered trump card. The lowest trump is the newly introduced "Le Chaos". The resultant deck cannot be used for any known Minchiate ruleset.

98 cards with 42 trumps order:

- #1-5 Cosmological objects (Chaos, Sun, Moon, Star, World), #6-9 Elements (Air, Earth, Water, Fire), #10-13 Age (Youth, Infancy, Adolescence, Old age), #14-18 Senses (Taste, Smell, Touch, Sight, Hearing), #19-24 Virtues (Prudence, Justice, Charity, Hope, Fortitude, Renown/Judgement), #25-30 Gods (Mercury, Bacchus, Amor, Venus, Momus, Fortune) #31-42 Months/Zodiac (January, February, March, April, May, June, July, August, September, October, November, December).

He or another member of the family also reused the engravings to create a 78-card tarot set. It has 21 numbered trumps and Momus as the Fool. Based on the order of the two highest trumps, it is arranged like the Tarot of Marseilles.

78 cards with 21 trumps and Fool order:

- Momus as the Fool, #1 Mercury, #2 Amor, #3-8 Virtues and Fortune (Hope, Fortitude, Fortune, Justice, Charity, Prudence), #9-12 Age (Old age, Youth, Adolescence, Infancy), #13-16 Elements (Water, Fire, Earth, Air), #17 Star, #18 Moon, #19 Sun, #20 Renown/Judgement, #21 World.

The de Poilly family's packs are the oldest know French-suited tarot decks, predating even the Animal Tarots that appeared around 1740.

=== Piatnik pack ===
Mysterious French-suited decks produced by Piatnik of Vienna around 1930 also featured forty trumps. It resembles the Industrie und Glück decks used for Central European tarock. Like the 54-card Industrie und Glück pattern, the plain suits consists of only 32 cards while the 40 trumps feature rustic genre scenes. With the Sküs (the Fool), the total number of cards is 73. Compounding the mystery is that the packaging is in French. Industrie und Glück type decks are not known to have a community of players in any French speaking country while the game of Minchiate is thought to have been restricted to only a few players in Genoa by the 1930s.

== Game ==
Minchiate can be played by two to four players with the most common version played by four players divided into two partnerships. The game, like other tarot games, is a trick taking game in which points are scored by capturing certain cards and sets of cards. As in most tarot games, the pip cards in cups and coins are in reverse order and play is counter-clockwise.

The lowest five trumps were called papi ("popes"). The highest five trumps (Star, Moon, Sun, World, Trumpets) were called arie ("airs") and have a special high scoring value in the game. Minchiate is similar in many ways to tarocchini played in Bologna. In these games, combinations (melds) of cards are more important than the value of individual cards.

Cards	Points
Trumps 36-40	10
The Fool, Kings, and Trumps 1, 10, 13, 20, 28, (29), 30-35	5
Trumps 2-5	3
All others	0

The last trick is worth 10 points. Trump 29 is a unique card, by itself it is worth nothing but when used in combinations (versicole), it is worth 5 points. Versicole are formed through a sequence of three or more of consecutive point cards. In addition, there are four irregular versicole:

- Versicola del Matto: Trumps 1, 40, and the Fool
- Versicola del Tredici: Trumps 1, 13, and 28
- Versicola delle diecine: Trumps 10, 20, and 30; or 20, 30, and 40; or 10, 20, 30, and 40
- Versicola dei Regi: Three or four kings

All versicole have to be declared at the beginning of the game. At the end of the round, each team will assemble versicole from their captured tricks. Trumps 1, 3, 13, 20, 28, and 30-38 are considered valuable cards to capture or protect because they are required to form some versicole or to deny the opposition the same. The Fool can be added to every versicola.

The minchiate deck was also used to play two games that don't use normal tarot rules, Al Palio and A sei tocchi.

=== 2-player rules ===
This is the simplest version of the game; it was not considered serious but only as an introduction to the more complex four player versions. Jetons are used to keep track of scoring. The dealer gives 25 cards to his opponent and himself. His opponent leads the first trick but instead of letting the dealer play, she declares any meld she has and scores. The dealer then declares his melds and scores. Each takes back their own cards and the dealer finishes the first trick. Players must follow suit. If they are unable to do so, they must play a trump. If unable to play a trump, then any card can be discarded. The winner of each trick immediately scores from the captured cards and leads to the next trick.

The Fool excuses the player from following suit, it can neither capture nor be captured. The player gives a worthless card from his trick pile in exchange to his opponent.

At the end of the round, each player adds to their running total the captured cards, melds from the captured cards, and the last trick bonus. The player who has captured more than 25 cards gets a bonus point for each extra card. The two players then compare their sums with the loser having to pay the winner the difference.

== In cartomancy ==
Although no documentation of a divination system using this pack of cards exists from previous centuries, but because of the allegorical and cosmological content, in recent years tarot occultists have proposed systems of divination and cartomancy that use the minchiate deck. In Charles Godfrey Leland's 1890 book Aradia, or the Gospel of the Witches, an incantation is given that mentions the use of "40 cards", which are renamed in the spell as 40 gods who are being invoked to compel the goddess Laverna to do the caster's bidding.

Paul Huson has speculated that these 40 cards are the 40 trumps of the minchiate deck. He has also pointed out that Leland's book Etruscan-Roman Remains in Popular Tradition (1892) contains a spell that is cast with tarocco cards, to invoke Janus.
