= Tarocco Bolognese =

62-suit deck of tarot cards

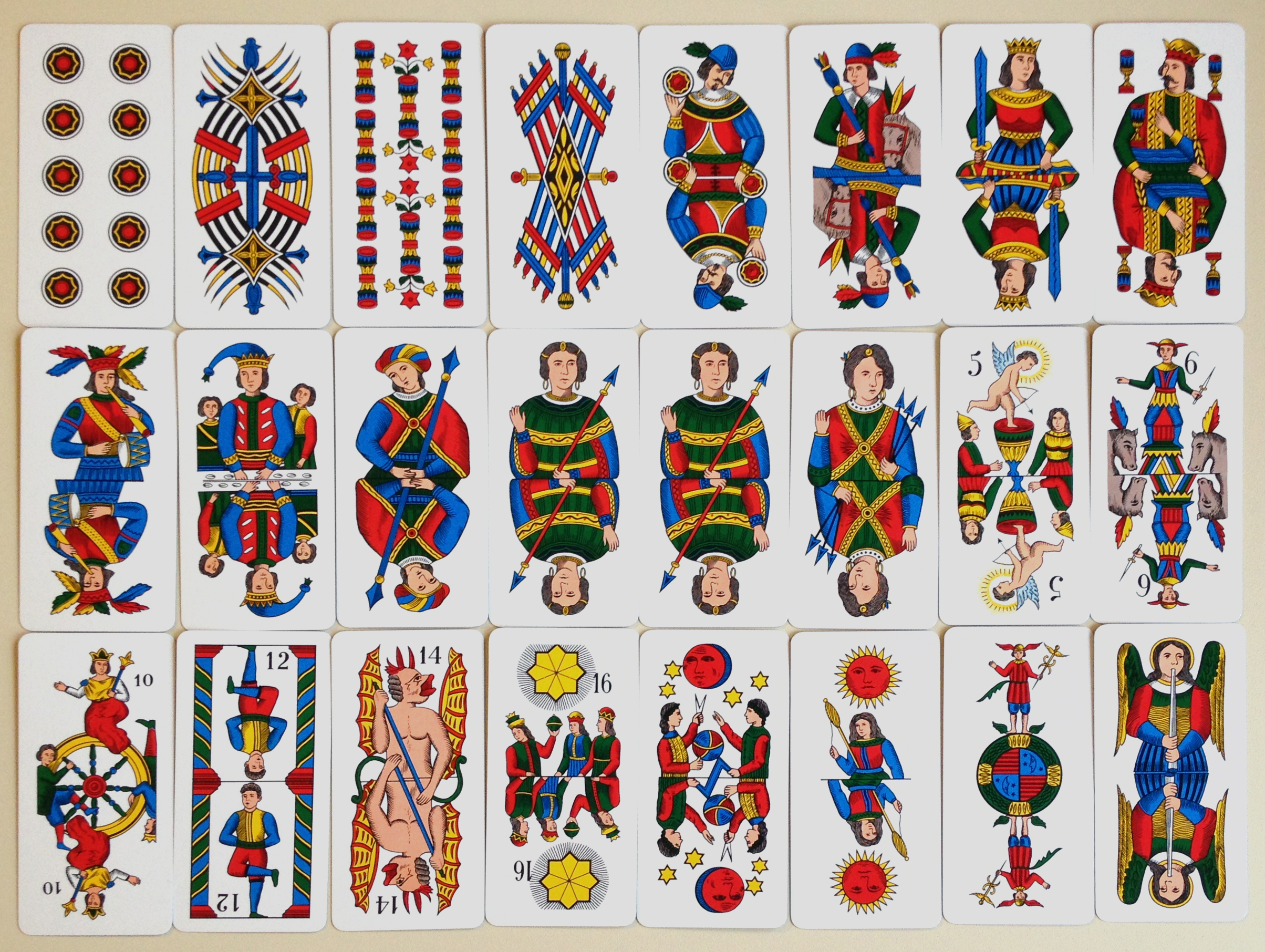
Modern cards by Dal Negro.

The Tarocco Bolognese is a tarot deck found in Bologna and is used to play tarocchini. It is a 62 card Italian suited deck which influenced the development of the Tarocco Siciliano and the obsolete Minchiate deck.

== History ==
The earliest mention of tarocchi in connection to Bologna was in 1442 when a Bolognese merchant sold two decks of trionfi in the city of Ferrara. The earliest known mention of trionfi in Bologna itself dates to 1459. Local tradition dating from at least the 17th century, ascribes the invention of tarot to Prince Francesco Antelminelli Castracani Fibbia (1360-1419), great-grandson of Castruccio Castracani. This is one of the oldest decks in continual use, dating back to at least the 15th century. The oldest surviving uncut sheets, dating from the late 15th or early 16th century, are held in the Rothschild Collection in the Louvre and in the École nationale supérieure des Beaux-Arts.

It is an expansion of the pre-existing Bolognese deck by adding queens, the Fool, and an extra suit of 21 trumps. The regular and tarot decks began to diverge during the 16th century. The Tarocco set removed ranks 2 to 5 bringing down the number of cards from 78 to the present 62 perhaps to simplify the game. The regular set removed ranks 8, 9, and 10 to create the 40-card pack as they are not needed to play Primiera. All ranks that they share in common appear very similar but are not identical.

The tarocco deck then underwent a few more modifications. The imperial and papal trumps, having been of equal rank, were converted to four moors, two of which are identical, in 1725. Later in that century the face cards and trumps became reversible and most trumps added Arabic numerals. None of the cards are labelled and only trumps 5 to 16 are numbered.

== Influence ==
Historically, this deck and its games have been confined to the city of Bologna yet there are decks in France and Belgium that show traces of designs borrowed from the Tarocco Bolognese. There are also tarot games played in present-day Piedmont that show the influence of tarocchini. In most games played with the Tarocco Piemontese, players treat trump 20 higher than 21 reflecting that the Angel outranks the World in Bolognese games. There are also regional games in Piedmont where pip cards are removed and the imperial and papal trumps are treated equally. The only surviving record of a tarot game being played in Ferrara showed it to be a three-player tarocchini game. The Tarocco Bolognese is also the earliest tarot deck to be used in cartomancy, predating de Gébelin and Etteilla by at least thirty years. Due to similarities in Bolognese cartomancy and Etteilla's system, it is possible the latter learned it from some Italian source (he claimed to have been taught by a Piedmontese man named Alexis). Unlike cartomantic traditions elsewhere, Bolognese practitioners have always used the same deck as local players instead of inventing dedicated decks and do not make a pretense of a mystical origin of their pack.

== Cards ==
=== Suits ===
The hierarchy of cards in the long suits (swords and batons) goes from King (highest), Queen, Knight, Knave, 10 to 6, and Ace (lowest). For the round suits of cups and coins it is King (highest), Queen, Knight, Knave, Ace, and 6 to 10 (lowest).

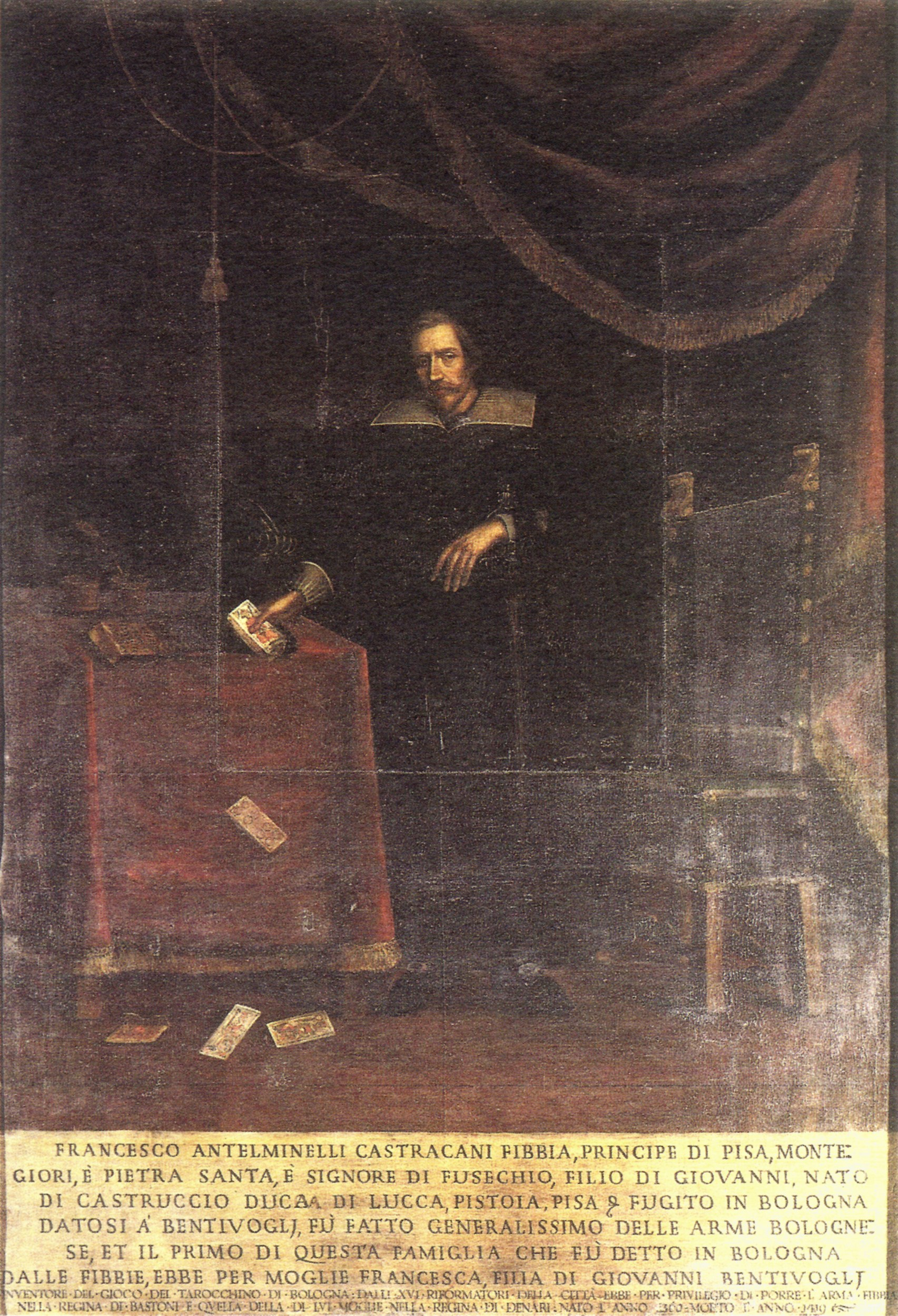
17th-century portrait of Francesco Fibbia with some cards.

=== Trumps ===
The trump cards are as follows:

| No. | Label | Translation |
|---|---|---|
| (20) | Angelo | Angel |
| (19) | Mondo | World |
| (18) | Sole | Sun |
| (17) | Luna | Moon |
| 16 | Stella | Star |
| 15 | Saetta; Torre | Lightning (Note: Literally, arrow. The medieval Boiardo–Viti tarot contains a suit of arrows.); Tower |
| 14 | Diavolo | Devil |
| 13 | Morte | Death (Note: Depicted riding a horse in all Italian tarots, save for Tarocco Piemontese.) |
| 12 | Traditore | Traitor |
| 11 | Vecchio | Old man |
| 10 | Roda | Wheel |
| 9 | Forza | Strength (Note: The three cardinal virtues occupy consecutive positions in all Italian tarots, save for Tarocco Piemontese.) |
| 8 | Giusta | Justice |
| 7 | Tempra | Temperance |
| 6 | Carro | Chariot |
| 5 | Amore | Love |
| (1–4) | Moretti | Four Moors |
| (0) | Begato | Magician |
