= Tarocco Piemontese =

Most common tarot card set in Italy

The Tarocco Piemontese (Tarot of Piedmont) is a type of tarot deck of Italian origin. It is the most common tarot playing set in northern Italy, much more common than the Tarocco Bolognese. The most popular Piedmontese tarot games are Scarto, Mitigati, Chiamare il Re, and Partita which are played in Pinerolo and Turin. This deck is considered part of Piedmontese culture and appeared in the 2006 Winter Olympics closing ceremony held in Turin. As this was the standard tarot pack of the Kingdom of Sardinia, it was also formerly used in Savoy and Nice before their annexation by France. Additionally, it was used as an alternative to the Tarocco Siciliano in Calatafimi-Segesta, Sicily. Outside of Italy, it is used by a small number of players in Ticino, Switzerland and was used by Italian Argentines.

This deck is not related to the non-tarot Piemontesi deck which uses French-suited hearts, diamonds, spades, and clubs. As such, their cards are not interchangeable.

== Composition ==
This deck pattern was derived from the Tarot of Marseilles but was made reversible for modern game playing. It consists of 78 cards: a trump suit of 22 cards, numbered from 0 to 21, and four 14-card suits of swords (spade), batons (bastoni), cups (coppe), and coins (denari). Each suit has a king (re), queen (donna), knight (cavallo) and jack (unlabelled), pip cards numbered from 2 to 10, and an unnumbered card with an elaborate suit symbol which acts as the ace. Trumps and most pip cards have indices in modern Arabic numerals (for trumps, cups, and coins) or Roman numerals (for swords and batons). Unusually, in most games trump 20 outranks trump 21 (this may have been influenced by Bolognese games).

=== Suits ===
Suit Tarocco Piemontese
| Suit | | | | |
| (United Kingdom) | Swords | Cups | Coins | Clubs |
| (Italy) | Spade | Coppe | Denari | Bastoni |
| (Spain) | Espadas | Copas | Oros | Bastos |

Tarocco Piemontese card deck (1865)
| | Ace | Two | Three | Four | Five | Six | Seven | Eight | Nine | Ten | Jack | Knight | Queen | King |
|---|---|---|---|---|---|---|---|---|---|---|---|---|---|---|
| Cups | | | | | | | | | | | | | | |
| Swords | | | | | | | | | | | | | | |
| Batons | | | | | | | | | | | | | | |
| Coins | | | | | | | | | | | | | | |
| Trumps | | | | | | | | | | | | | | |

=== Trumps ===
The order of the trumps, in most games played with this pack, is:

| Image | Number. Label. | Image | Number. Label. | Image | Number. Label. | Image | Number. Label. |
|---|---|---|---|---|---|---|---|
| | (unnumbered) il matto The Fool | | I. il bagatto The Pagat | | II. la papessa The Popess | | III. l'imperatrice The Empress |
| Reminiscent of a pair (Note: The tarot deck is precisely one and a half times the size of the standard 52-card deck, its additional twenty-six cards, namely four queens and twenty-two trumps, forming the exact equivalent of two extra card suits, (Note: Decks with five and six suits, respectively, were already attested as early as John of Rheinfelden's late 14th century treatise.) hence the aforementioned doubling, within this initial (sub)section.) (Note: The trumps of the contemporary Boiardo–Viti tarot consist of ten consecutive pairs of men and women, each embodying a vice and a virtue, respectively.) of jacks. (Note: The page of batons, for the former, and those of coins or spades, for the latter.) | | | | Reminiscent of a pair of queens. (Note: In the contemporary Sola Busca tarot, all court cards (save for jacks) are explicitly labelled with additional meanings, taken from classical literature.) | | | |
| | IIII. l'imperatore The Emperor | | V. il papa The Pope | | VI. (Note: One of the three theological virtues: love (VI), faith (IX) and hope, the latter being usually conflated.) (Note: The human fate (X) or lifespan, encompassing marriage (VI), old age (IX) and death (XIII), wedlock (VI) and monasticism (IX) being often contrasted.) (Note: Imagery reminiscent of astrological signs, as found, for instance, in this 16th century German woodcut: Sagittarius (VI), Libra (VIII), Leo (XI), Aquarius (XIV, XVII), Virgo (XIV, XVII, XXI), Cancer (XVIII), Gemini (XIX). The Minchiate explicitly depict all twelve constellations of the zodiac.) gli amanti The Lovers | | VII. la carossa (il carro) The; Chariot |
| Reminiscent of a pair of kings. | | | | Reminiscent of an archer, (Note: The contemporary Visconti-Sforza Tarot depicts death with a bow, instead of a scythe, while the earlier Boiardo–Viti deck contains a suit of arrows. An atypical 15th century jack of batons, hosted at the Guildhall Library, is portrayed as an archer aiming at a heron (see also Ambraser Hofjagdspiel).) like those found in the William Tell pack. (Note: First and last row, third from the left.) | | Reminiscent of a knight. | |
| | VIII. (Note: One of the four cardinal virtues, from justice (VIII) to temperance (XIV), the wisdom of old age (IX) complementing the strength of youth (XI).) la giustizia Justice | | VIIII. (Note: Hermits voluntarily renounce ephemeral distractions (0–I), carnal pleasures (VI), and worldly ranks or titles (II–V, VII–VIII).) l'eremita The Hermit | | X. (Note: Hanging (XII) and being drawn on the breaking wheel (X) constitute medieval forms of torture, execution and capital punishment, oftentimes unto death (XIII).) r(u)ota di fortuna Wheel of Fortune | | XI. la forza Strength |
| Reminiscent of a queen of swords. | | Reminiscent of Diogenes. (Note: The Boiardo–Viti and Sola Busca tarots feature exclusively mythical and historical figures of classical antiquity for their trumps and face cards.) | | Fate, consisting of rise or ascent, climax or apogee, and downfall or descent. | | See Samson's riddle, Nemean lion, (Note: The contemporary da Tortona deck has Hercules wearing its skin.) and lions in heraldry. | |
| | XII. l'appeso The; Hanged Man | | XIII. (Note: Medieval Christianity saw death (XIII) as the consequence of original sin, itself the result of temptation by the devil (XV), the former being undone by the resurrection unto eternal life, and the latter being condemned at the last judgement, hence the imagery and title of the XX^{th} trump (1 Thessalonians 4:16). In the surviving Visconti-Sforza decks, all intervening trumps between Death and Judgment are either wholly absent from, or form later additions to the original set.) (la morte) Death (unlabelled) | | XIIII. la temperanza Temperance | | XV. (Note: The cosmological (sub)section, depicting the various vertical layers of the world (XXI), listed in ascending order, from hell (XV) to heaven (XX).) il diavolo The Devil |
| Reminiscent of Judas, (Note: The Sola Busca tarot includes two biblical characters in its trump suit. Before 1613, French playing cards featured Judas Maccabeus as the jack of clubs, the gibbet's supporting pillars being reminiscent of batons, and the young man of a knave. In the contemporary Visconti-Sforza Tarot, Strength, occupying the previous position, also resembles a page of wands.) who hung himself, after betraying Jesus. (Note: Labelled The Traitor, in other Italian tarots.) | | Depicted as the grim reaper; (Note: The only Italian tarot not depicting death riding a horse.) occupies the same position in all tarots. | | Reminiscent of a maid of cups, like those found in Visconti-Sforza, (Note: The complete Cary-Yale set.); Portuguese-suited playing cards, and the Minchiate. | | The underworld or nether- world, envisioned as a subterranean realm. | |
| | XVI. la torre The Tower | | XVII. le stelle The Stars | | XVIII. la luna The Moon | | XVIIII. il sole The Sun |
| A tower, (Note: In other tarots (Belgium, Viéville), a tree.) rising towards the sky, and a lightning strike, descending from heaven. | | Shares similar imagery with Temperance, itself reminis- cent of a maid of cups. | | Night and day. The main luminaries of the celestial sphere. | | | |
| — | | | XXI. il mondo The World | | XX. il giudizio (l'angelo) The; Judgement (The Angel) | — | |
| — | | The world to come after the last judgement (XX). | | The angelic heaven, above the firmament. | | — | |
| — | | The last two trumps are reversed in all Italian tarots. | | | | — | |

Transformation of the Fool from the Marseilles to modern Piemontese pattern

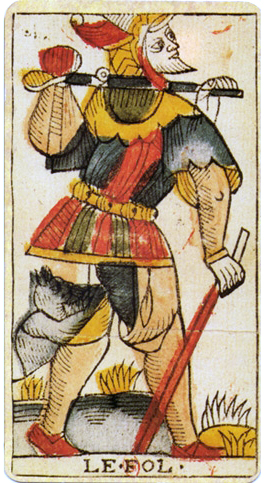
Dodal of Lyon (1701-1715)

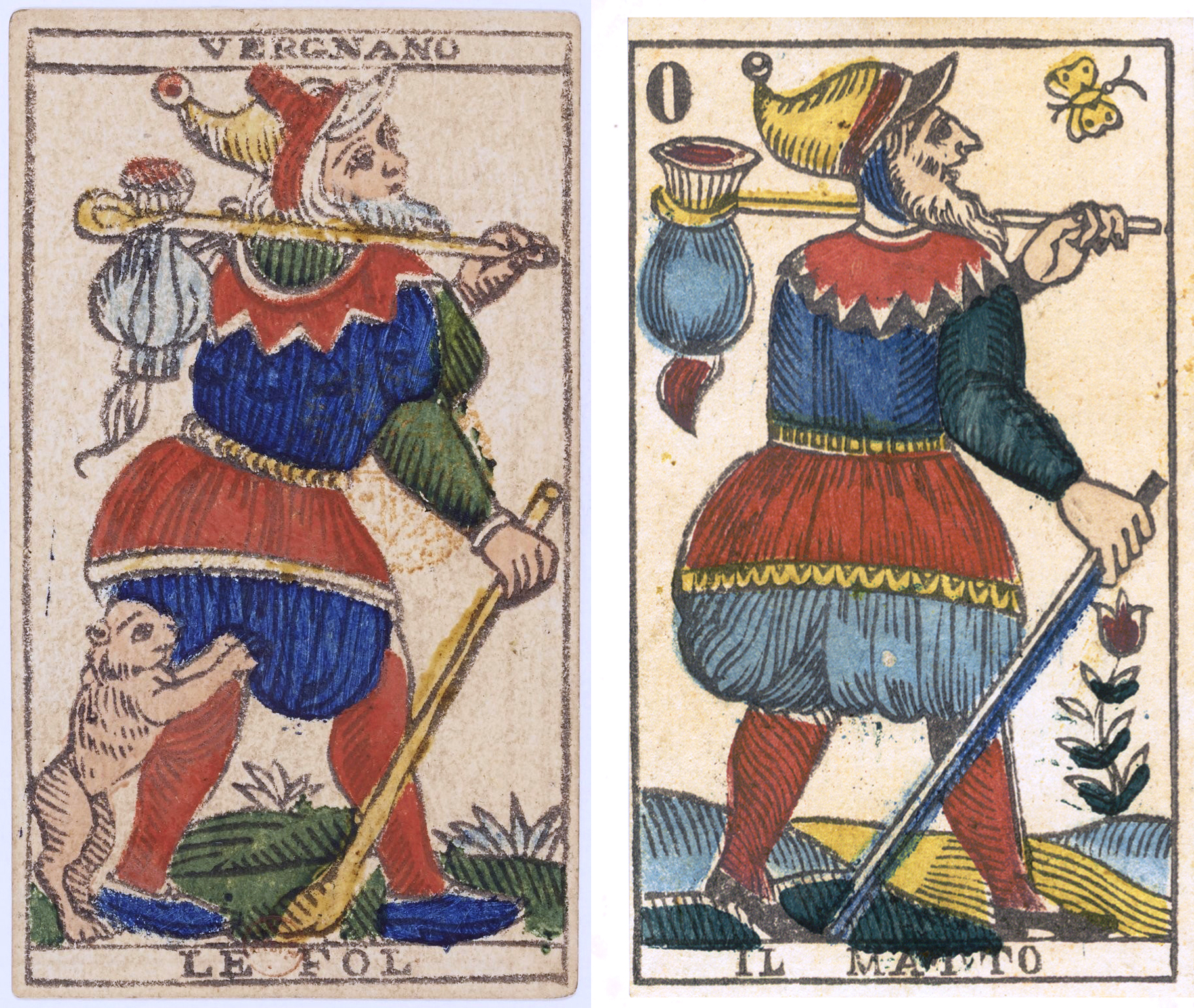
Vergnano of Turin, 1827 and 1830

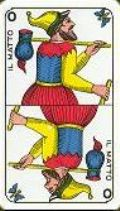
Modern

The unnumbered Fool (Il Matto) is played as an excuse: it can beat nothing, but can always be played to a trick, relieving the holder from the obligation to follow suit. In only two games recorded in the 18th and 19th centuries is the Fool treated as the lowest trump.

Like in most tarot games outside of France and Sicily, the order of the cards in swords and batons is king, queen, knight, jack, X, IX, ... I, while in the ranking of the cards in cups and coins is king, queen, knight, jack, 1, 2, ... 10.

== History ==
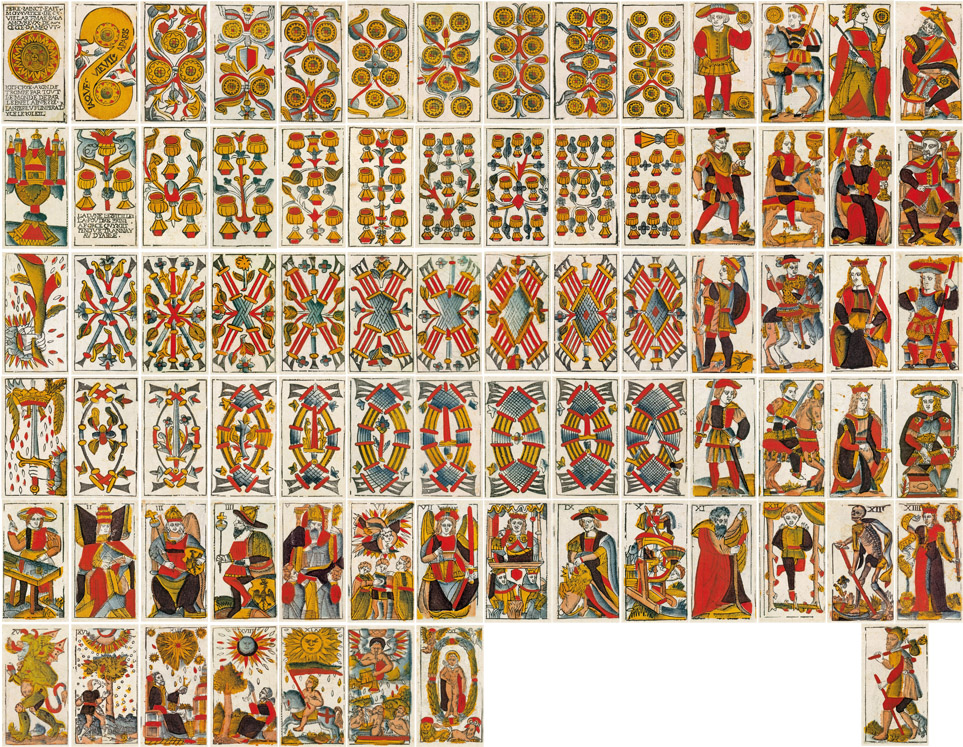
Viéville's tarot, circa 1650.

Tarot decks were in production in Pinerolo by 1505. The best description of 16th century Piedmontese tarot is by Francesco Piscina who wrote a discourse about it in Mondovì in 1565. Although his details about the game are sparse, his terminology strongly implies Bolognese and Florentine influence. Like in tarocchini, he treats the imperial and papal trumps as equals, a feature which still survives in Asti. Like in Bologna, the highest trump is the Angel which outranks the World. Excluding Piedicavallo, Piedmontese players persist in ranking the Angel as higher than the World despite their modern numbering. In addition, some players remove the lower ranking pip cards to create a 62-card deck like in Bologna; others go further to make a 54-card deck like in Cego. How Piscina ranked his trumps is very similar to two other 16th century lists from Lombardy. All three lists are similar to the ranking of a sole surviving deck produced by Jacques Viéville of Paris around 1650, which has features found in Bolognese, Florentine, and Ferrarese tarots. This has led to speculation that players from Northwest Italy may have used decks similar to Viéville's until around 1700 when economic collapse drove regional cardmakers out of business. As no cards before this period survive, this theory cannot by substantiated.

After the collapse, players resorted to importing the Tarot of Marseilles from France. When production resumed around 1735, the cards were almost identical to the Marseilles pattern, including the French captions. Efforts to localize the cards began in the early 19th century eventually resulting in the double-ended cards of today by the end of that century. After Savoy and Nice were annexed by France, players there continued using this deck until 1900 when the Tarot Nouveau began to spread across the country. At the beginning of the 20th century, there was an effort to create a competing deck in Chambéry using the Piedmontese version of the Paris pattern as the base for a new tarot pack, but ultimately proved unsuccessful. Reproductions of this pack have been made since 1984.
