= The Tower (tarot card) =

Tarot card of the Major Arcana

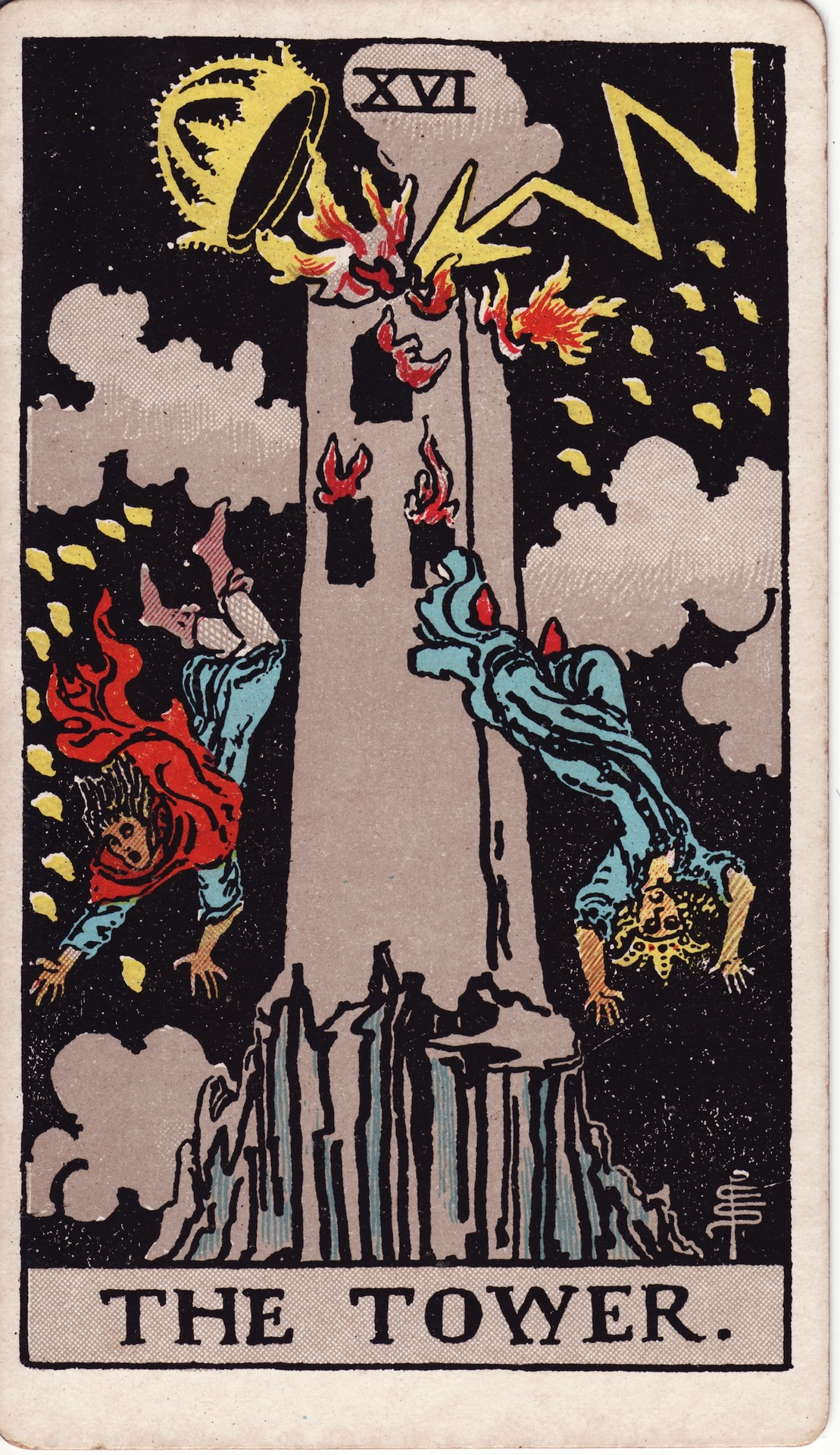
The Tower in the 1909 Rider–Waite tarot deck

The Tower (XVI) (most common modern name) is the 16th trump or Major Arcana card in most Italian-suited tarot decks. It has been used in tarot cards since the 15th century as well as in divination since the mid-19th century.

== History ==
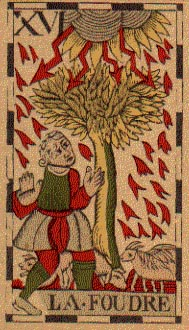
The Belgian Tarot depicts a tree struck by lightning. It is captioned La Foudre, French for strike of lightning.

This card follows immediately after The Devil in all tarots that contain it, and is associated with sudden, disruptive revelation, and potentially destructive change. Some early painted decks, such as the Visconti-Sforza tarot, do not contain it.

Early printed decks that preserve all their cards do feature The Tower. In these decks the card bears a number of different names and designs. In the Minchiate deck, the image usually shown is of two nude or scantily clad people fleeing the open door of what appears to be a burning building. In some Belgian tarots and the 17th-century tarot of Jacques Viéville, the card is called La Foudre or La Fouldre ('The Lightning'), and depicts a tree being struck by lightning. In the Tarot of Paris (17th century), the image shown is of the Devil beating his drums, before what appears to be the mouth of Hell; the card still is called La Fouldre. The Tarot of Marseilles merges these two concepts, and depicts a burning tower being struck by lightning or fire from the sky, its top section dislodged and crumbling. Two men are depicted in freefall against a field of multicolored balls. Pamela Colman Smith's version is based on the Marseilles image, with small tongues of fire in the shape of Hebrew yod letters replacing the balls.

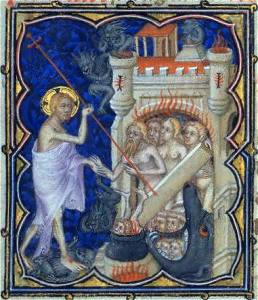
In this manuscript picture of the Harrowing of Hell, Jesus forces open the fiery tower gate of Hell to free the virtuous dead from Limbo. The enactment of this scene in liturgical drama may be one source of the image of the Tower.

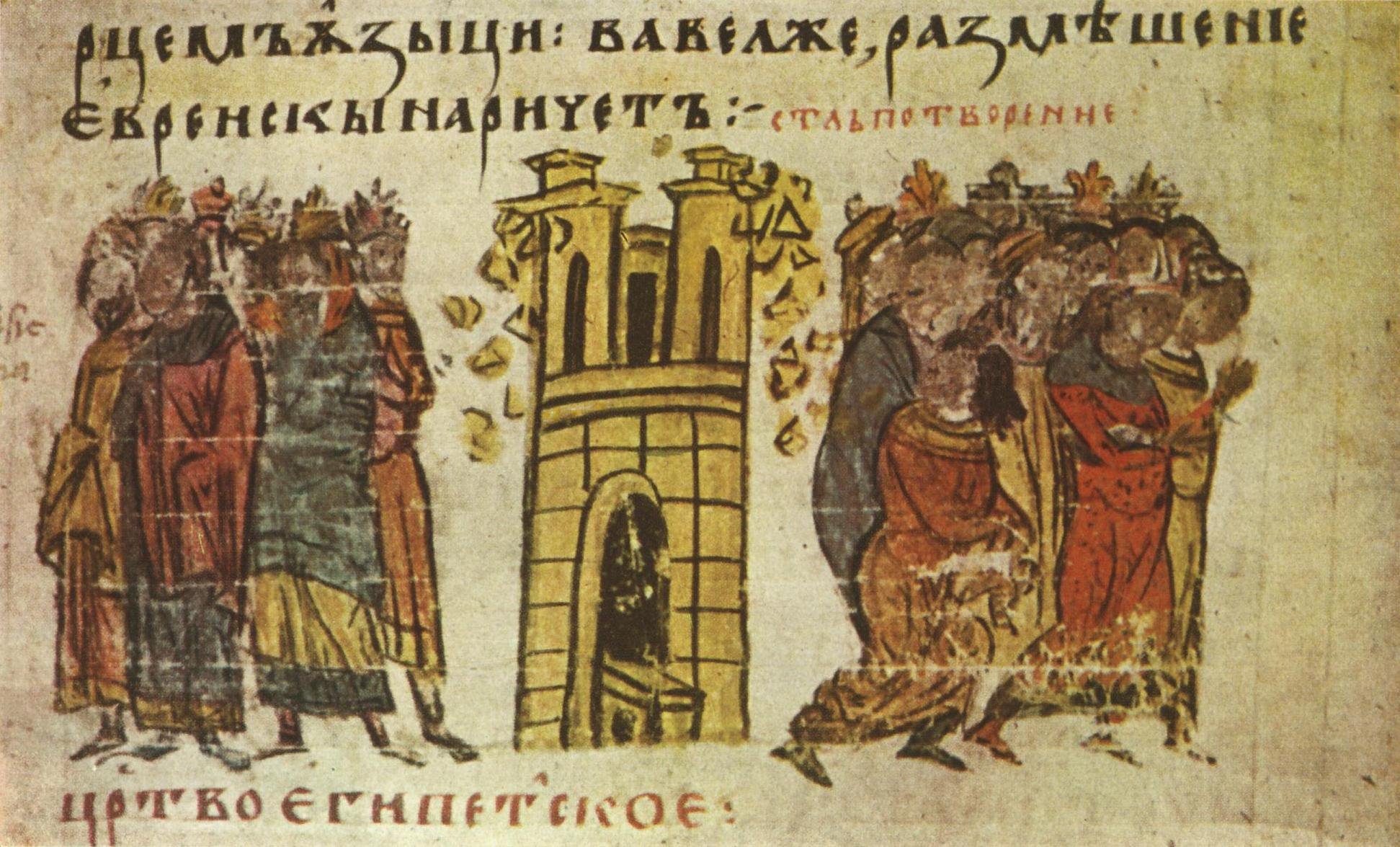
The destruction of the tower of Babel is depicted in this Bulgarian manuscript.

A variety of explanations for the images on the card have been attempted. For example, it may be a reference to the biblical story of the Tower of Babel, where God destroys a tower built by mankind to reach Heaven. Alternatively, the Harrowing of Hell was a frequent subject in the liturgical drama of the Late Middle Ages, and Hell could be depicted as a great gate knocked asunder by Jesus Christ. The Minchiate version of the deck may represent Adam and Eve's expulsion from the Garden of Eden.

== Symbolism ==
The Tower is widely associated to danger, crisis, sudden change, destruction, higher learning, and liberation. In the Rider–Waite deck, the top of The Tower is a crown, which symbolizes materialistic thought being bought cheap, downcast.

The Tower is associated with the planet Mars.

According to A. E. Waite's 1910 book The Pictorial Key to the Tarot, the Tower card is associated with:

16. THE TOWER.-- Misery, distress, indigence, adversity, calamity, disgrace, deception, ruin. It is a card in particular of unforeseen catastrophe. Reversed: According to one account, the same in a lesser degree; also oppression, imprisonment, tyranny.

In the Golden Dawn system it corresponds to the Hebrew letter Peh, and in the French system it corresponds to Ayin.
