= Scarto =

Tarot card game

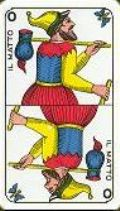
- The Fool in a Tarocco Piemontese pack
- Origin: Italy
- Type: Trick-taking
- Players: 3
- Skills: Tactics, Strategy
- Cards: 78
- Deck: Tarocco Piemontese
- Rank (high→low): Trump suit: 20, 21, 19-1; Long suits: K Q C J 10 9 8 7 6 5 4 3 2 1 Round suits: K Q C J 1 2 3 4 5 6 7 8 9 10
- Play: Counter-clockwise
- Chance: Moderate

Related games
- Troccas

Scarto is a three player trick-taking tarot card game from Piedmont, Italy. It is a simple tarot game which can serve as an introduction to more complex tarot games. The name comes from the discarded cards that were exchanged with the stock, which is also the origin of the name for the Skat card game.

== Deck ==
The 78-card Italian suited Tarocco Piemontese is used to play this game but the French suited Tarot Nouveau deck can be a substitute. The deck should contain 56 cards divided into four suits each with ten ranks of pip cards and four ranks of face cards plus a suit of 21 trumps and one suitless card, the Fool.

The order of the long (swords and batons) or black (spades and clubs) suits goes from King, Queen, Cavalier, Jack, 10 ... 1 while the round (cups and coins) or red suits (hearts and diamonds) goes from King, Queen, Cavalier, Jack, 1 ... 10. Trump 20 also outranks 21 as in most Piedmontese tarocchi games.

Card Points:

- Kings and Trumps 1 and 20: 5 points
- Queens and the Fool: 4 points
- Cavaliers (Knights): 3 points
- Knaves (Jacks): 2 points
- All others: 1 point

== Rules ==
The dealer hands everyone 25 cards with three remaining cards as the stock. The dealer can exchange cards with the stock. The discarded cards (scarto) will join his trick pile. The dealer cannot discard any card worth 5 points or the Fool. Trump 1 can be discarded if the dealer has no other trump (including the Fool).

Play is counter-clockwise; the player to the right of the dealer leads the first trick. Players must follow suit otherwise they must play a trump if possible. The winner of each trick leads to the next until all cards are played.

The Fool can be played at any time. It is not part of any suit but excuses the player from following suit; it cannot win any tricks or be captured. If the Fool leads the trick, the next player's card sets the trick's suit. When using the Fool, the player simply shows the card and puts it in his own trick pile. Unlike in more advanced tarot games, the player does not need to exchange the Fool with a worthless card.

After the hand has been played, the player's trick pile cards are counted in threes. Add up the points in each trick won then subtract 2 points from it. The Fool is counted separately; the player who won the trick that had the Fool should have two remaining cards. An extra point is added to this, then subtract two as usual. There should be 78 points divided between the three players so each player will have to subtract 26 from their total point count to get their game score. The player to the right of the dealer is the next dealer; the game continues until all players have dealt. The loser is the one with the lowest cumulative score and has to pay the winners, traditionally with a drink.
