= The Emperor (tarot card) =

Tarot card of the Major Arcana

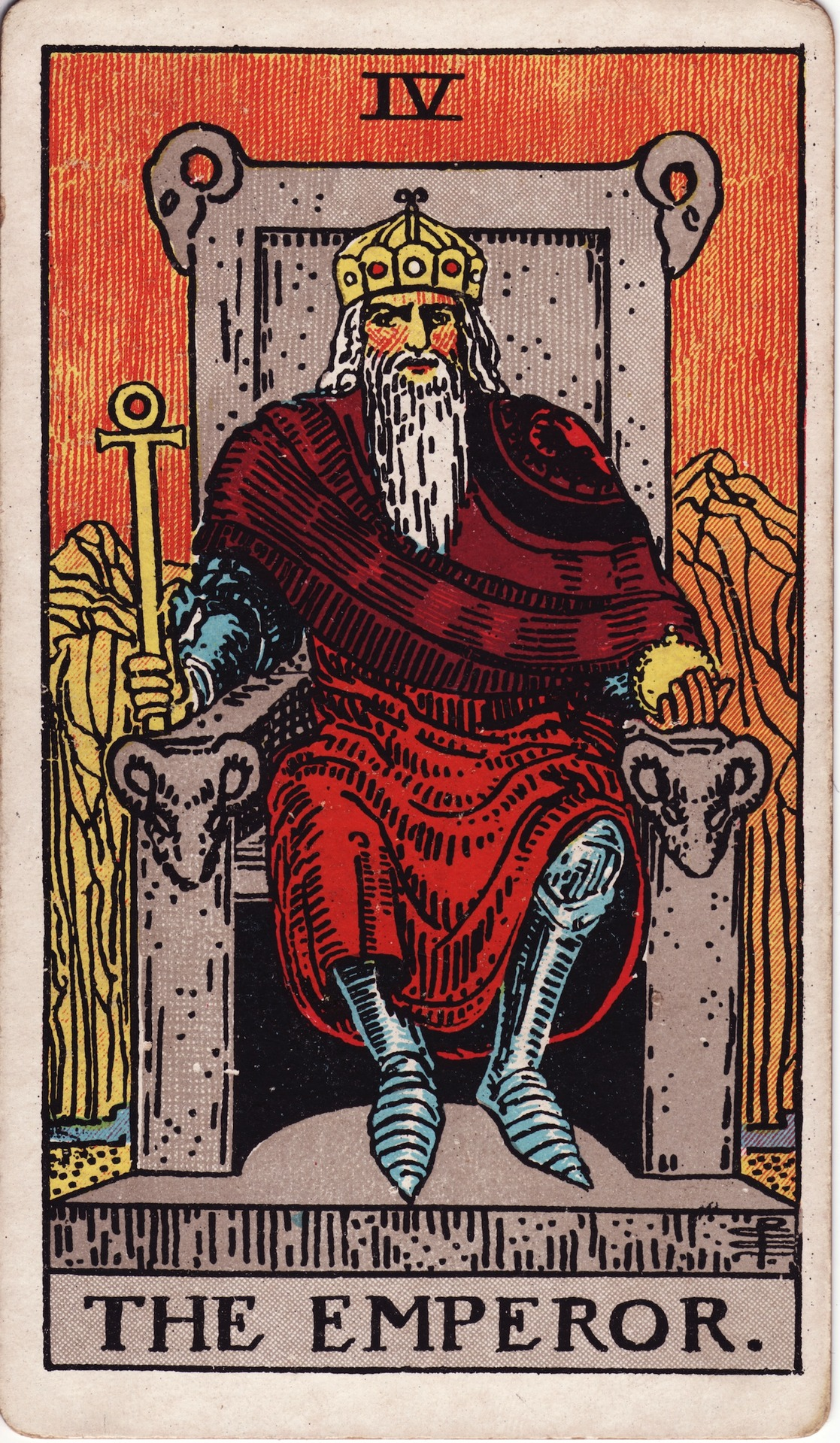
The Emperor (IV) in the Rider–Waite tarot deck

The Emperor (IV) is the fourth trump or Major Arcana card in traditional tarot decks. It is used in game playing as well as in divination. As a symbol of authority, stability, and structure, he represents order and discipline in contrast to the intuitive, nurturing qualities of The Empress. The Emperor is associated with masculine energy, leadership, and the enforcement of law and tradition. In astrology, he is linked to Aries, a cardinal fire sign ruled by Mars, further emphasizing his characteristics of initiative and power.

== History and evolution ==
The Emperor has been a part of tarot decks since their earliest iterations in the 15th century, including the Visconti-Sforza and Marseille Tarot decks. Originally depicted as a regal figure seated on a throne, the card evolved in later decks such as the Rider-Waite Tarot, where additional symbolism, such as the ram heads on the throne (symbolizing Aries), was introduced. The Hermetic Order of the Golden Dawn and 20th-century occultists, such as Aleister Crowley, expanded on The Emperor's esoteric significance, integrating Kabbalistic and astrological elements.

== Symbolism and imagery ==
The Emperor is traditionally depicted seated on a stone throne, representing stability and unyielding authority. His posture is commanding, exuding a sense of control and discipline. His armor suggests strength, protection, and readiness for battle, reinforcing his role as a figure of power. The throne itself is often adorned with ram heads, symbolizing Aries and its associations with leadership and determination. In his hands, he holds a scepter, representing dominion and control, and an orb, signifying his worldly authority. His red robes emphasize his passion and decisive nature, while the mountainous background conveys steadfastness and endurance.

== Interpretation ==
When drawn upright, The Emperor signifies leadership, responsibility, and structure. It suggests stability and protection, highlighting a time of strategic action and discipline. The card often appears in readings concerning career, finances, and governance, reinforcing the idea of an established and authoritative influence. It may also represent a father figure or an external force providing guidance and order.

Reversed, The Emperor can indicate excessive control, tyranny, or rigidity. It may point to an abuse of power, struggles with authority, or an inability to establish order. In some cases, it signifies weakness in decision-making or a resistance to necessary structure, warning against stubbornness or oppressive leadership.

== Relationship with other Major Arcana cards ==
The Emperor and The Empress together create a balance of structure and creativity, governance and nurture. Where The Empress represents intuition and the organic flow of life, The Emperor brings order and a sense of stability. Compared to The Hierophant, who represents institutional law and spiritual guidance, The Emperor embodies worldly authority and the enforcement of established rules. In contrast to The Fool, who represents boundless potential and freedom, The Emperor introduces structure and discipline, shaping raw energy into a directed force.

== Cultural and psychological perspectives ==
From a psychological perspective, The Emperor aligns with the Jungian Ruler archetype, representing authority, governance, and structure in the collective unconscious. Mythologically, he is often associated with deities of dominion and law, such as Zeus, Jupiter, Odin, and Osiris, all figures known for their leadership and enforcement of order. In political symbolism, The Emperor serves as a reflection of rulership, governance, and the fine line between tyranny and strong leadership.
