= The Sun (tarot card) =

Tarot card of the Major Arcana

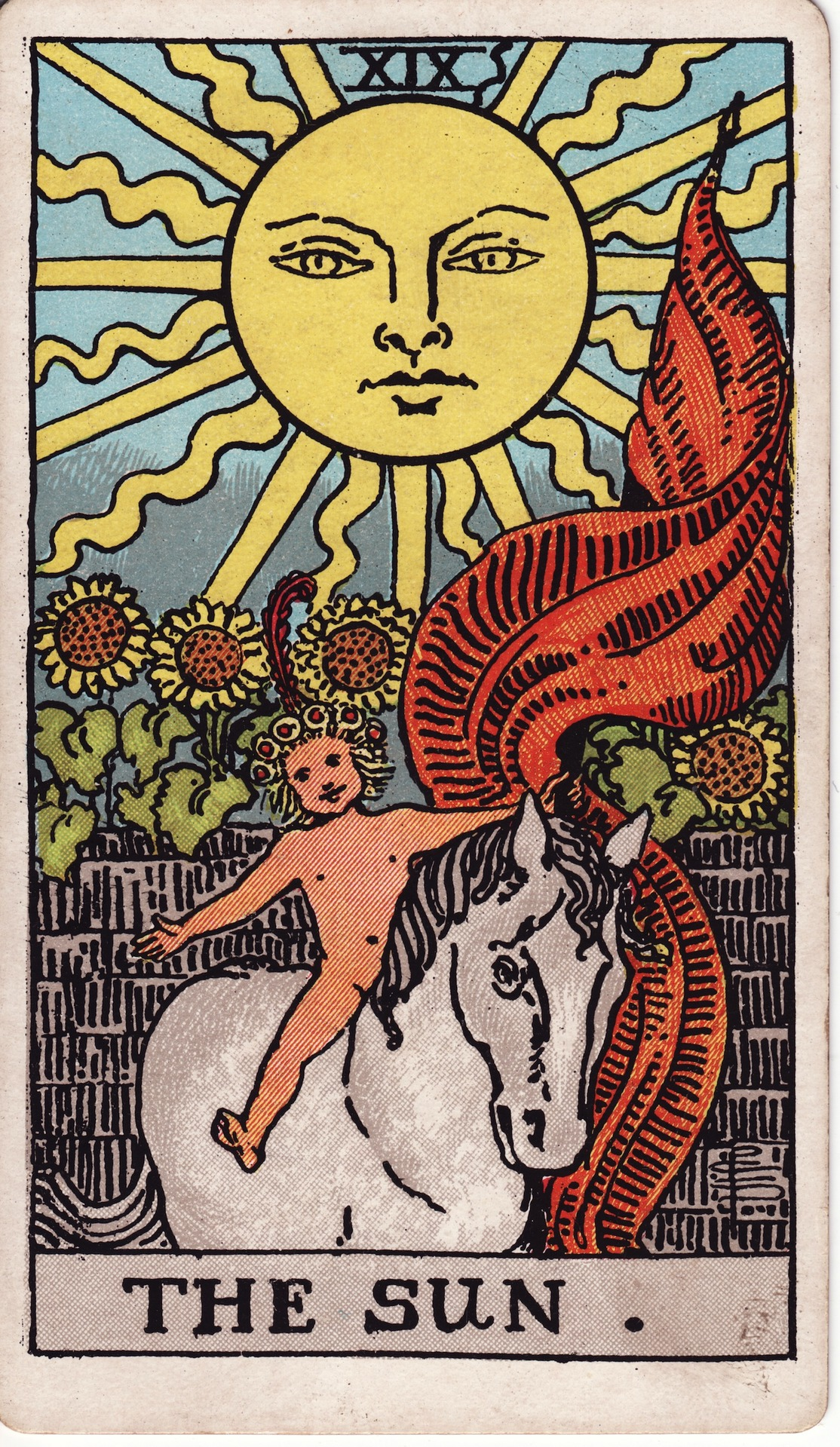
The Sun (XIX) from the Rider–Waite tarot deck

The Sun (XIX) is the nineteenth trump or Major Arcana card in most traditional tarot decks. It is commonly associated with joy, success, vitality, and illumination. The card symbolizes positivity and represents a time of clarity and personal growth.

== Description ==
In the Rider–Waite deck, The Sun depicts a radiant Sun shining over a naked child riding a white horse. The child represents innocence and freedom, while the horse symbolizes purity and strength. Behind them, sunflowers bloom, symbolizing growth and abundance. The imagery emphasizes happiness, clarity, and the triumph of light over darkness.

== Interpretation ==
A. E. Waite suggested that this card is associated with attained knowledge. The child of life holds a red flag, representing the blood of renewal, while a smiling Sun shines down on him, representing accomplishment. The conscious mind prevails over the fears and illusions of the unconscious. Innocence is renewed through discovery, bringing hope for the future.

This card is generally considered positive. According to Waite it is said to reflect happiness and contentment, vitality, self-confidence, and success. When drawn upright, The Sun signifies success, happiness, and enlightenment. It suggests a period where the truth is revealed, leading to optimism and personal fulfillment. The card is often seen as a sign of achievement and authentic self-expression. When drawn reversed, The Sun may indicate temporary setbacks, self-doubt, or delayed success, but its overall positive nature suggests that any challenges are transient and can be overcome with persistence.

== Astrological and esoteric associations ==
The Sun is linked to the astrological Sun, representing ego, identity, and life force. It is associated with the zodiac sign Leo, known for confidence, creativity, and generosity. In Thelema, the card is connected to the Solar Phallic current and represents the manifestation of True Will. It corresponds to Tiphareth on the Tree of Life, symbolizing harmony, beauty, and the central light of the soul.
