= The Chariot (tarot card) =

Tarot card of the Major Arcana

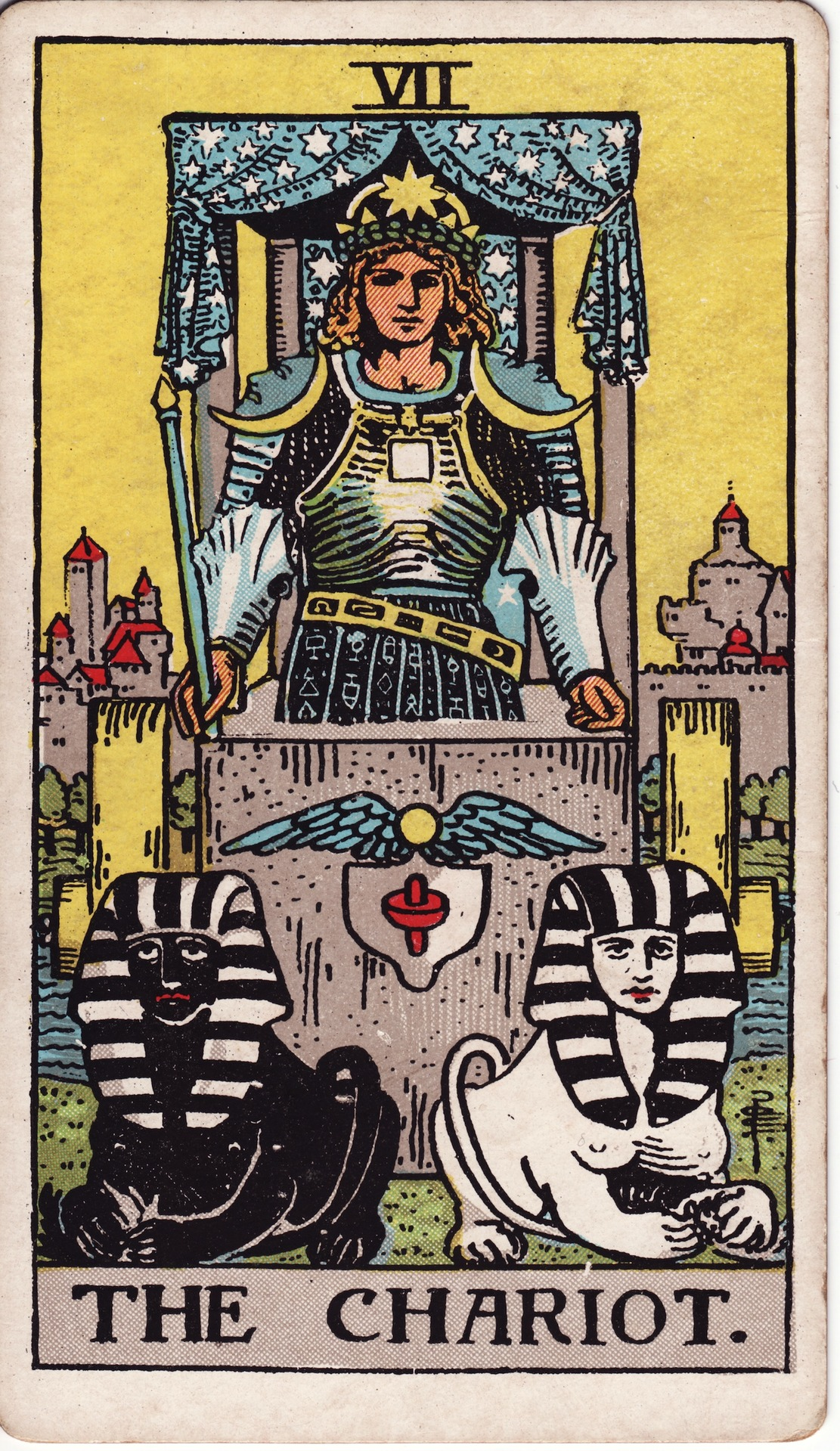
The Chariot in the Rider–Waite tarot deck

The Chariot (VII) is the seventh trump or Major Arcana card in most traditional tarot decks. It is used in game playing as well as in divination.

== History ==
Similarly to how The Empress, The Emperor and Justice are reminiscent of a queen, a king, and the queen of swords from the minor arcana, (Note: In the medieval Sola Busca tarot, all court cards, save for jacks, are explicitly labelled with additional meanings, usually taken from biblical or classical literature.) the Chariot resembles a horse riding knight, one of the three original face cards, before being eventually replaced by the queen in French suits and Russian playing cards. The trionfi, a medieval precursor to the tarot, appeared during the Renaissance, which saw the reemergence of the Roman triumph as the trionfo, both public processions featuring a horse-driven carriage or chariot as their centerpiece. The same era witnessed the revival of widespread interest in Greco-Roman writings, some of which mentioned the ancient art of chariotry. The European war wagon (Note: Made extensive use of archers and crossbowmen, consistent with The Chariot's vicinity to The Lovers, traditionally depicting an arrow-wielding putto as cupid.) and wagon fort, first developed during the Hussite wars, are contemporaneous with da Tortona's deck, the oldest trionfi ever made, all three dating to around 1420. The carroccio, used in battle during the High Middle Ages, experienced its decline and ultimate extinction during the preceding century.

== Description ==
A figure sits in a chariot, although he holds no reins, he is pulled by two sphinxes or horses. There is often a black and white motif, for example one of the steeds may be black and the other white. The figure may be crowned or helmeted, and is winged in some representations. The figure may hold a sword or wand.

The Thoth Tarot deck has the figure controlling four animals.

The mallet, or gavel, on the chariot's coat of arms is a Masonic symbol representing self control.

A canopy of stars above the charioteer's head is intended to show "celestial influences".

== Interpretation ==
According to A.E. Waite's 1910 book, The Pictorial Key to the Tarot, the Chariot card carries several divinatory associations:

7. THE CHARIOT.—Succour, providence; also war, triumph, presumption, vengeance, trouble. Reversed: Riot, quarrel, dispute, litigation, defeat.

In astrology, the Chariot is associated with the feminine, cardinal-water sign of Cancer and its ruling planetary body, the Moon.
