= Tarocchini =

Tarot card games popular in northeast Italy

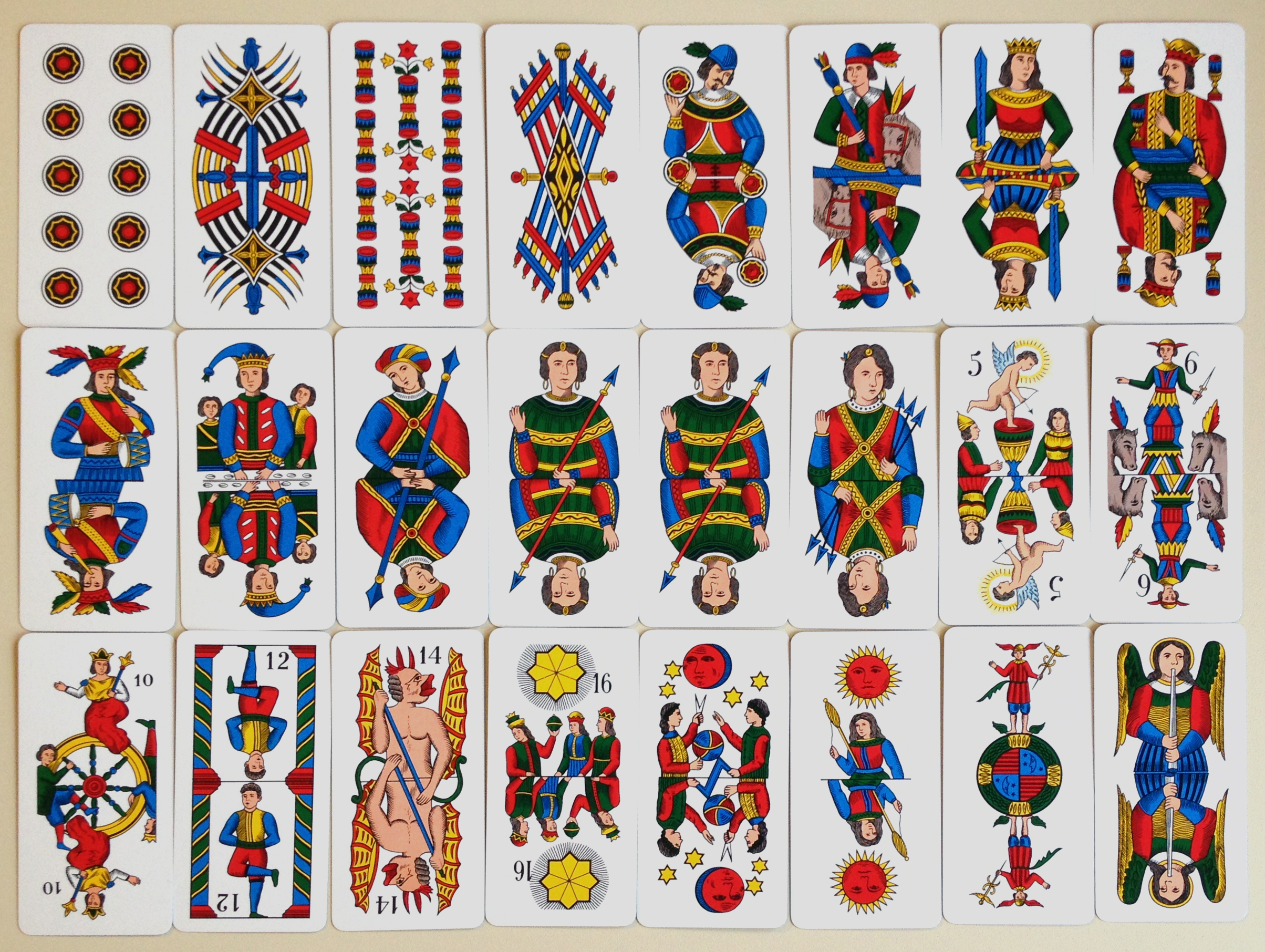
- Origin: Italy
- Type: Trick-taking
- Players: 2-7
- Skills: Tactics, Strategy
- Cards: 62
- Deck: Tarocco Bolognese
- Rank (high→low): Trump suit 20-0; Long suits: K Q C J 10 9 8 7 6 A Round suits: K Q C J A 6 7 8 9 10
- Play: Counter-clockwise
- Playing time: 30 min.
- Chance: Moderate

Related games
- Minchiate

Tarocchini (plural for tarocchino) are point trick-taking tarot card games popular in Bologna, capital city of the Emilia-Romagna region of Italy and has been confined mostly to this area. They are the diminutive form of tarocchi (plural for tarocco), referring to the reduction of the Bolognese pack from 78 to 62 cards, which probably occurred in the early 16th century.

The games of Tarocchini are very complex, yet the rules have changed little over the years.

== Deck description ==
No.	Label	Translation	Value
(20)	Angelo	Angel	5
(19)	Mondo	World	5
(18)	Sole	Sun	1
(17)	Luna	Moon	1
5–16	Numeri di scavezzo	Numbered trumps	1
(1=4)	Moretti	Moors	1
(0)	Begato	Magician	5
Suit	Re	Kings	5
Suit	Regine	Queens	4
Suit	Cavalli	Knights	3
Suit	Fanti	Jacks	2
Suit	Carte numerate	Pip cards	1
•	Matto	Fool	5

Tarocchini can be played with a 78-card Tarot deck (where the 2–5 pip cards in each suit have been removed), though normally, a special Tarot deck, the Tarocco Bolognese is used. The trump cards have a unique ordering where the second to fifth trumps are known collectively as the Moretti (Moors) and are of equal rank (the last one played is the highest, in regards to taking a trick). In the Tarocco Bolognese, these cards are depicted with four Moors, two of which are identical.

The Fool is not a trump, it can't beat any cards and is played as an excuse from following suit. The Magician is the lowest trump. However, both the Fool and the Magician may be used as contatori (counters or wild cards) to assist in making sequences. The contatori are very valuable, because they can be used as wild cards in multiple locations. The four highest trumps, which are unnumbered, are Angel, World, Sun, and Moon and they are collectively known as grande (big). Angel, World, Magician, and the Fool are collectively known as tarocchi.

The grande, Moretti, and contatori are not numbered in the Tarocco Bolognese.

In the modern game, the cards won by each side are counted in pairs, with 1 being subtracted from the total for each pair. There are also six points for winning the final trick, giving a total of 93 points.

== Common rules ==
In tarocchini, card points are not as important as bonus or meld points gained from combinations. Combinations can either be associative or sequential. Associative combinations or cricche (formerly as pariglie) consist of three or four of a kind sets.

Associative combination	Three of a kind points	Four of a kind points
Tarocchi	18	36
Kings	17	34
Queens	14	28
Cavaliers	13	26
Jacks	12	24

There are four types of sequential combinations although two of them are more like associative combinations. Each sequence needs at least three cards for 10 points and every extra card is worth 5 points. What separates the sequences from the cricche is the use of the contatori. The contatori may not be used to substitute Angel or a King. For trumps, the sequence ends if the contatori are used consecutively with one exception: if the two cards replaced are trump 16 and a grande.

Sequence	Minimum requirement	Extra cards
Trumps	Angel and at least two of the next three grande (one of which mustn't be a wild card)	Consecutive numbered trumps
Suits	King and at least two face cards of the same suit (one of which mustn't be a wild card)	Ace of the same suit
Moors	Two Moors plus a third Moor which can be a wild card	Up to six Moors with wild cards
Aces	Two Aces plus a third Ace which can be a wild card	Up to six Aces with wild cards

Multiplicative bonuses occur when three or more cricche or three or more sequences are made at one time. This doubles the points.

== Variations ==
=== Ottocento ===
Ottocento, is the most popular version. It is played by 4 players in two partnerships sitting opposite each other. The middle part of the game is very similar to the basic tarot game. It adds a round of point-counting before and after the game based on sets and runs of the cards. An unusual feature is that the partners are allowed to make certain limited signals to each other during play.

As usual for Tarot card games, dealing and card play are counter-clockwise. The dealer gives 15 cards to each player, in 3 rounds of five cards apiece. The dealer picks up the last two cards adding it to those in hand. The dealer has to discard two cards, which can not be "5 point" cards (such as kings, or the trumps worth 5 points). The discards are counted as points to the dealer's side, unless they make no tricks at all during the card play in which case the discarded cards must be surrendered to the opponents.

After the first 5 cards have been dealt, if all players agree the game may andare a monte. If this happens, all the cards are thrown in, and the deal passes to the next player. Eldest hand speaks first, declaring a monte if wishing to restart the game. This continues with each player until it reaches the dealer. If all have declared a monte, then the game will be restarted.

The game consists of three parts. Just after the hand has been dealt, all players may score their hands according to the meld points contained within. Next, normal card play occurs. Finally, the partners score any meld points that they have in their captured tricks. The scoring of meld points after card play is unique to Tarocchini and Minchiate.

==== Declarations ====
After the cards have been dealt, each player may declare certain combinations of hand cards to collect meld points. The player does not have to declare anything, and may optionally declare a smaller set or run than actually held. Anything that is declared must be placed face-up on the table. The decision of what to declare is an interesting strategic choice.

==== Game play ====
Once the first declaration of points is finished, normal card play ensues. Note that some information has been disclosed by the declarations, so players will have more clues than usual as to the contents of the other players' hands. As in all tarocchi games, there is the rule that a player that can't follow suit must trump if possible. If lacking trumps, then any card can be discarded. The Fool excuses the player from following suit: it is played to the trick instead of following suit, and then retrieved to its player's pile of won tricks. The Fool's player gives a low valued card to the trick's winner (only if it is an opponent) at the end of the hand. If the Fool's team failed to win any trick, the Fool is surrendered to the opponents but this is very rare. One of the most important strategies is to capture or protect the Begato as it is very useful in scoring. The last trick has a bonus of 6 points.

During play, eldest is permitted to make certain signals to his or her partner. The current game allows only three signals:

- Throwing up the card up which means "I'm now void in this suit". Originally, the signal was opening a hand.
- Drawing back the card towards oneself means "You should lead with trumps".
- Knocking the table with a fist means "You should try to win with your highest card and lead the next trick with the same suit."

These are some of the formerly allowed signals:

- Saying sminchiate means " Lead your highest trump"
- Striking the centre of the table means "I have the highest card of the suit (including trumps)."
- Striking the table's edge means "I have the second highest card..."
- When on lead, drawing back the card slightly towards oneself before laying it down means "Do not play your highest card of the suit in question".

==== Scoring ====
Once all tricks have been completed, the captured cards are examined for meld points. Combine these meld points with the meld points from declarations at the beginning of the hand. Next, count card points in pairs with one point subtracted from each pair. Then add the last trick bonus. After adding the meld points with the card points and last trick bonus, the first team to reach 800 wins. It is actually possible to win at the declarations if one team can reach 800 points. If both teams can do it, the team with the higher points win.

=== Terziglio ===
Terziglio is for three players and the only version to include bidding. Each player is dealt 18 or 19 cards with 8 or 5 going to the stock. During bidding, players can pass, bid gioco, or bid solo which is the highest bid. In gioco, the declarer can exchange cards with the stock but cannot discard 5-point cards. The stock counts towards the declarer if able to win at least one trick otherwise it is surrendered to their opponents. In solo, the declarer plays without exchanging with the stock which remains hidden and is awarded to the winner of the last trick. All other rules are the same as Ottocento but some players restrict signalling until the highest card of the trick's suit has been played (Kings or the Angel).

==== Scoring ====
Each side adds up all their points as in Ottocento. The declarer must have more points than their opponents to win the hand, a tie is counted as a loss. The winning side's points are rounded down to the nearest multiple of 50 (except if it fell short of a multiple of 50 by less than 5 points it will be rounded up). The score is then divided by 50 to arrive at the game points. If it was a solo game, the game points are doubled. Score calculation is unnecessary if one side won all the tricks; they are automatically awarded 40 game points.
