= Wheel of Fortune (tarot card) =

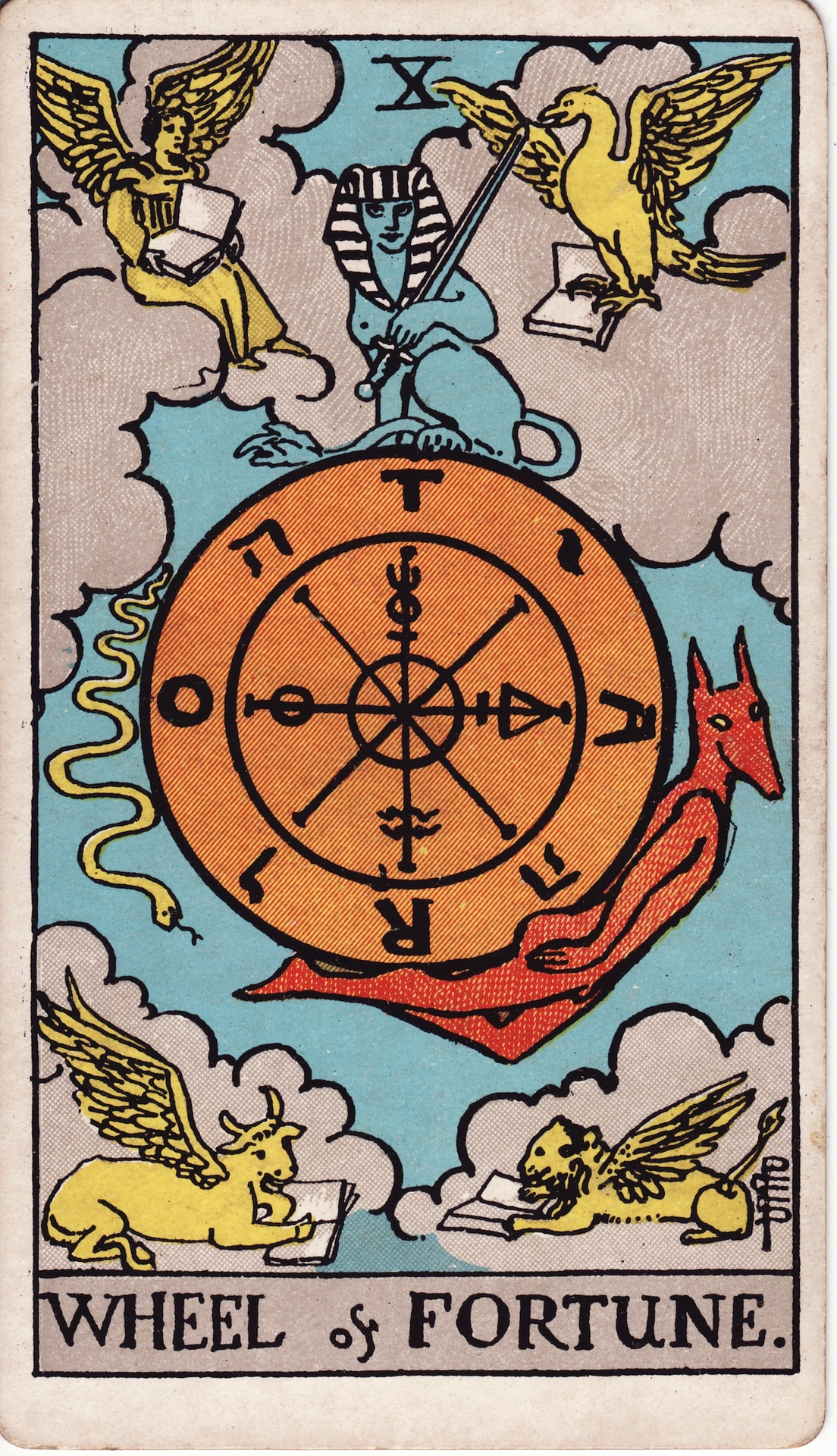
Wheel of Fortune (X) from the Rider–Waite tarot deck

Wheel of Fortune is one of 78 cards in a tarot deck and is the tenth trump or Major Arcana card in most tarot decks. It is used in game playing as well as in divination.

== Description ==
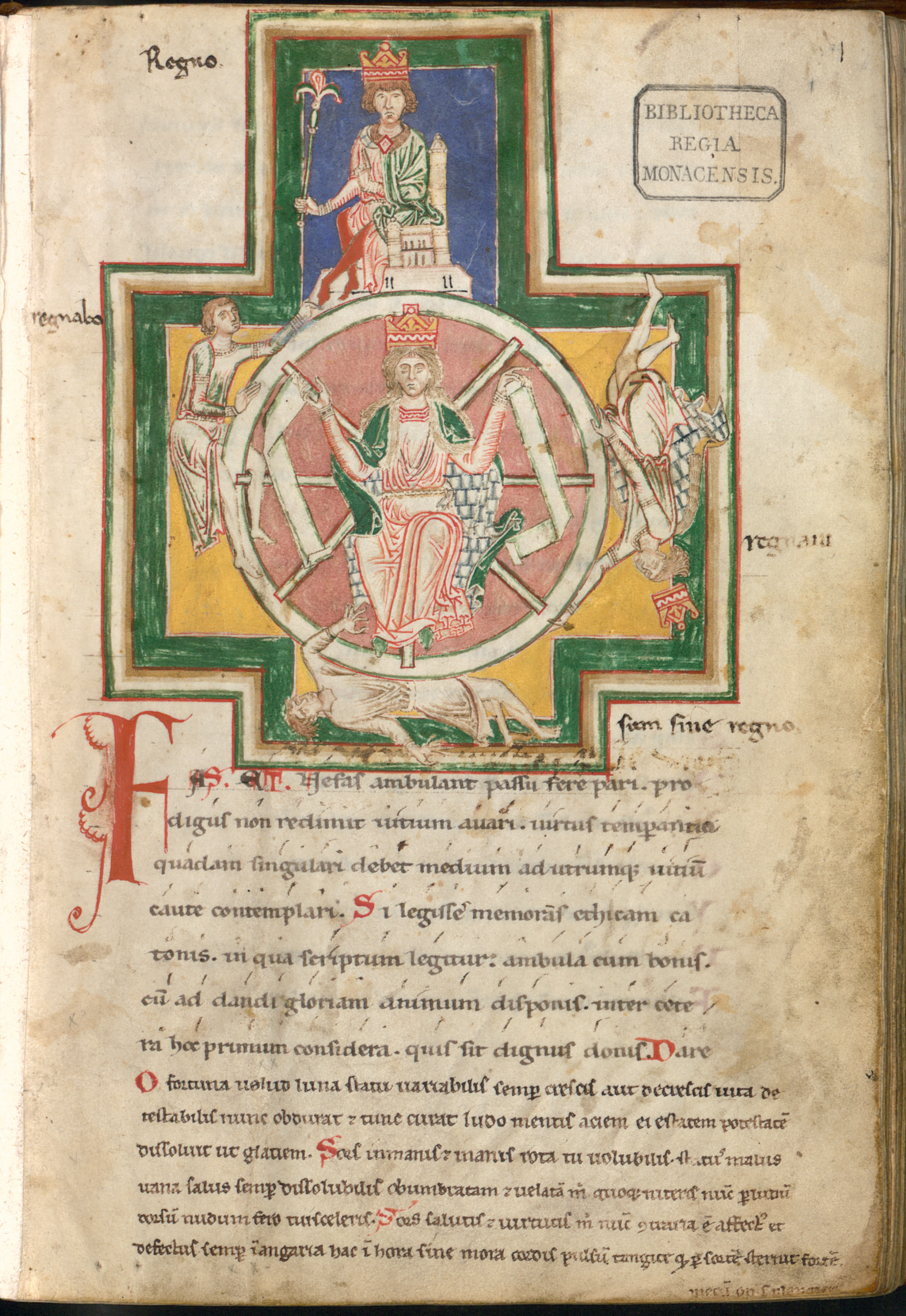
The Wheel of Fortune was a common allegorical symbol in European iconography. The four figures shown either climb, are at the summit, or fall, or at the bottom of a revolving wheel presided over by personified Fortuna.

The card pictured is the Wheel Of Fortune card from the Rider–Waite tarot deck. A.E. Waite was a key figure in the development of the tarot in line with the Hermetic magical-religious system which was also being developed at the time, and this deck, as well as being in common use today, also forms the basis for a number of other modern tarot decks.

According to Waite's 1910 book Pictorial Key to the Tarot, the Wheel of Fortune card carries several divinatory associations:

10.WHEEL OF FORTUNE—Destiny, fortune, success, elevation, luck, felicity. Reversed: Increase, abundance, superfluity.

The Wheel Of Fortune card, like other cards of the Major Arcana, varies widely in depiction between tarot decks. The card has been modeled ever since the tarot's inception in the 15th century after the medieval concept of Rota Fortunae, the wheel of the goddess Fortuna. Images generally show a six- or eight-spoked wheel, often attended or crested by an individual (sometimes human; sometimes a Sphinx-like half-human) attired in an Egyptian-style headdress. In some decks, such as the AG Müller, the wheel is also attended by an individual wearing a blindfold; and often there are people sitting or riding on the wheel whilst others are shown falling from it.

The wheel is not always shown inscribed with any lettering. Where this is the case, the letters T-A-R-O (clockwise) or T-O-R-A (counter clockwise) can often be found aligned against four of the spokes, which can also be interpreted as R-O-T-A, the Latin word meaning "wheel". In some decks, such as the Waite, the wheel is also inscribed with additional alchemical symbols representing the four elements: Earth, Air, Fire and Water (which are also said to be represented throughout the tarot by the four "suits" of Pentacles or Discs, Swords, Wands, and Cups respectively. These emblems can also be seen on the Magician's table in the Magician card [Card I]).

On the Waite card shown, though not necessarily on others, there are also four yellow winged creatures in the corners of the card, representing the symbols of the four Evangelists (The Lion, the Ox, the Man and the Eagle). These four Evangelists are also represented by the four fixed astrological signs: Taurus, Leo, Scorpio and Aquarius. In addition a representation of the god Anubis is seen rising with the wheel on the right side, while the snake-like Typhon descends on the left. On the wheel, alternating with the letters T-O-R-A are the Hebrew letters י-ה-ו-ה, usually transliterated as YHWH (Yahweh - Hebrew for God).

== Interpretation ==
A common aspect to most interpretations of this card within a reading is to introduce an element of change in the querent's life, such change being in station, position or fortune: such as the rich becoming poor, or the poor becoming rich.
