= Visconti–Sforza Tarot =

15th-century tarot deck

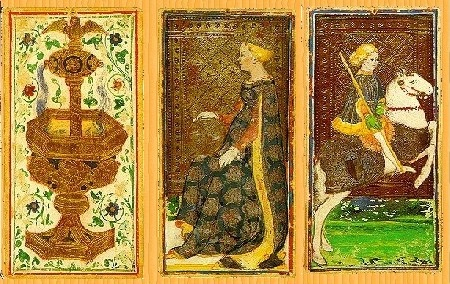
Cards from the Pierpont Morgan Bergamo deck

The Visconti–Sforza Tarot is used collectively to refer to incomplete sets of approximately 15 decks from the middle of the 15th century, now located in various museums, libraries, and private collections around the world. No complete deck has survived; rather, some collections have a few face cards, while some consist of a single card. They are the oldest surviving tarot cards and date back to a period when tarot was still called Trionfi ("triumphs" i.e. trump) cards, and used for everyday playing. They were commissioned by Filippo Maria Visconti, Duke of Milan, and by his successor and son-in-law Francesco Sforza. They had a significant impact on the visual composition, card numbering and interpretation of modern decks.

== Overview ==
The surviving cards are of particular historical interest because of the beauty and detail of the design, which was often executed in precious materials and often reproduce members of the Visconti and Sforza families in period garments and settings. Consequently, the cards also offer a glimpse of nobiliary life in Renaissance Milan, which the Visconti called home since the 13th century.

The three most famous sets are discussed in more detail below.

=== Pierpont Morgan Bergamo ===
This deck, also known as Colleoni–Baglioni and Francesco Sforza, was produced around 1451. Originally composed of 78 cards, it now contains 74, i.e. 20 trumps, 15 face cards, and 39 pip cards. The Morgan Library & Museum in New York City has 35, the Accademia Carrara has 26 in its catalogue, while the remaining 13 are in the private collection of the Colleoni family in Bergamo. Trumps and face cards have a gilt background, while the pip cards are cream-coloured with a flower and vine motif. The two missing trumps are the Devil and the Tower. Modern published reproductions of this deck usually contain attempted reconstructions of missing cards.

The figures on the suit of bastoni wear silver pleated garments and carry a long staff; a large vessel tops either end except for the King, whose staff has a finial only at the top. Those on the suit of cups wear gold garments, embellished by the heraldic device of sun and rays; each figure holds a large chalice, as is often the case with the suit. The suit of spades shows figures dressed in full armour, carrying a large sword. The characters represented on denari wear garments decorated with blue ribbons wound around circular suns.

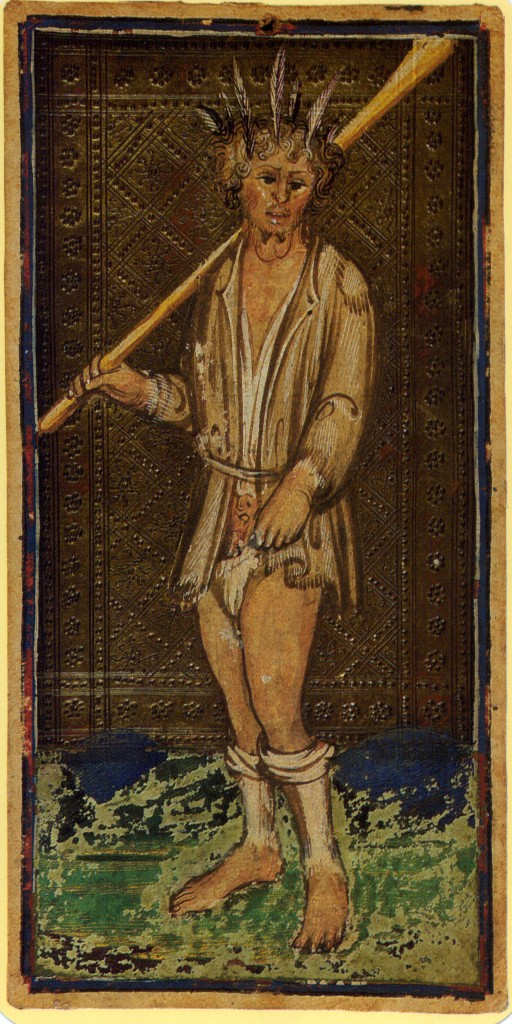
The fool

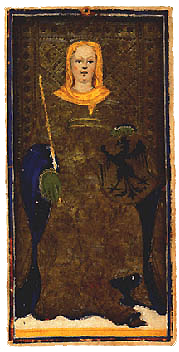
The Empress

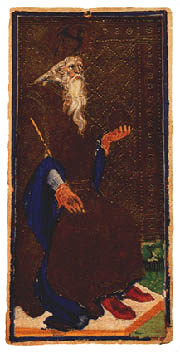
The Emperor

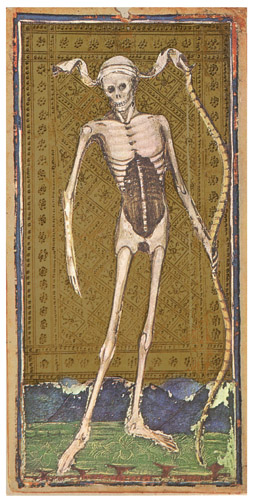
Death

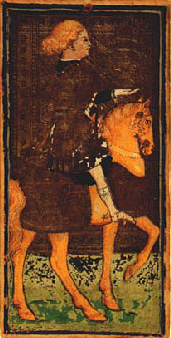
Knight of cups

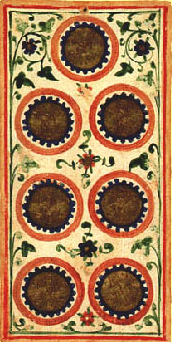
Seven of denari

=== Cary–Yale ===
Named after the Cary Collection of Playing Cards, absorbed into the Yale University Library in 1967, it is also known as the Visconti di Modrone set, and has been dated back to around 1466. Some scholars have, conversely, suggested this may be in fact the oldest of sets, perhaps commissioned by Filippo Maria Visconti at the onset of the project.

The deck consists of 67 surviving cards (11 trumps, 17 face cards, and 39 pip cards), including unusual trumps such as Faith, Hope, and Charity. According to the Yale University Library, the complete original deck would have comprised a minimum of 89 cards.

In the 2007 book The History of the Tarot, scholar Giordano Berti proposes that the deck was produced between 1442 and 1447, because the denari (coin) cards bear the recto and verso of the golden florin coined by F. M. Visconti in 1442 and withdrawn from circulation at his death, in 1447.

The Cary–Yale is the only historical Western deck with six ranks of face cards, as the "Damsel" and the "Lady on horse" supplement the traditional King, Queen, Knight and Jack. Their ranks can be determined by their positions: standing, mounted on a horse, or enthroned. The trumps also contain the three theological virtues which appear only here and in Minchiate decks. All trump cards have a gilt background, while the pip cards have a silver one.

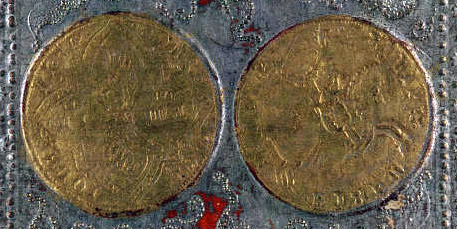
Detail from the four of denari

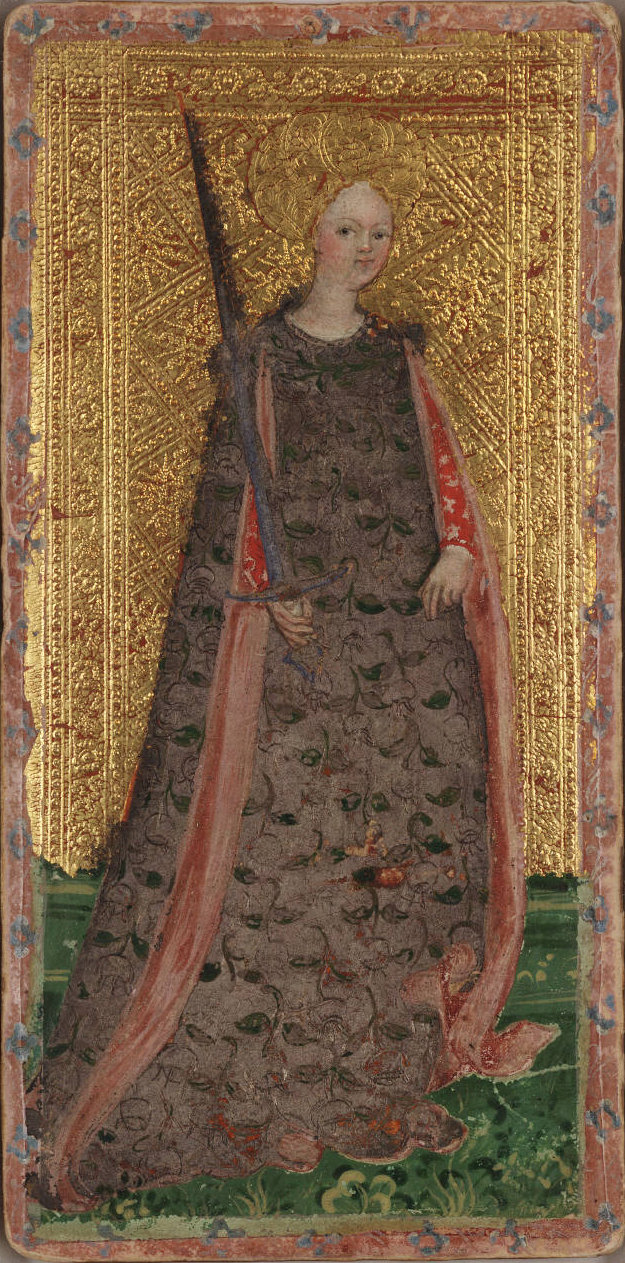
Damsel of swords

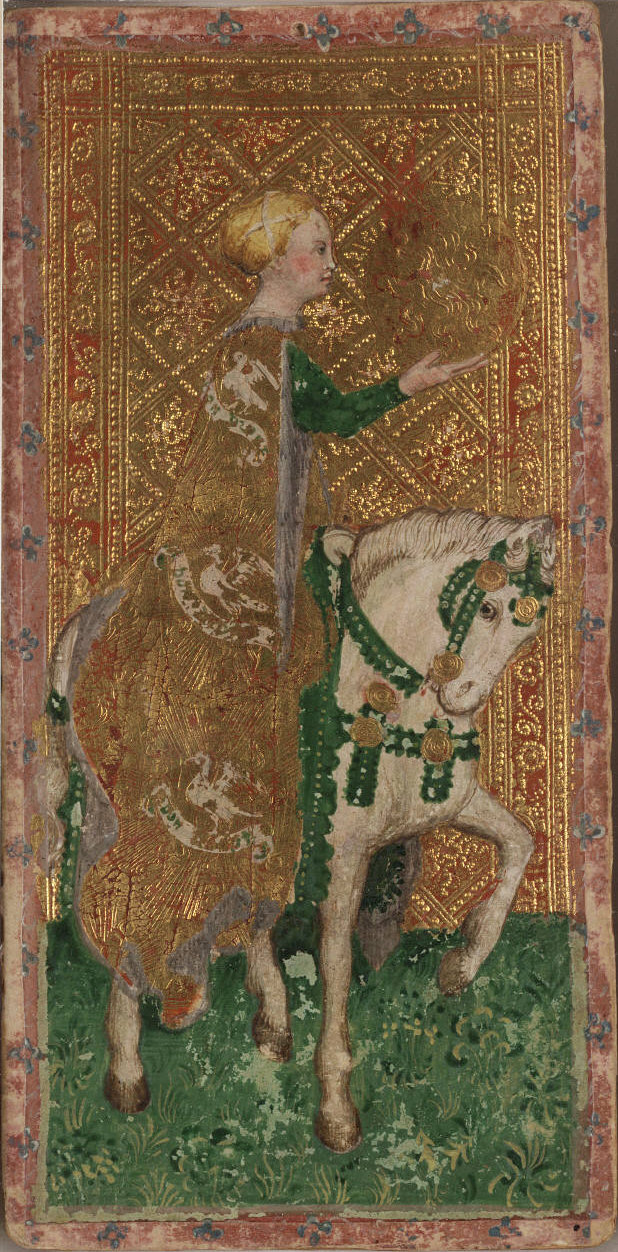
Mounted lady of denari

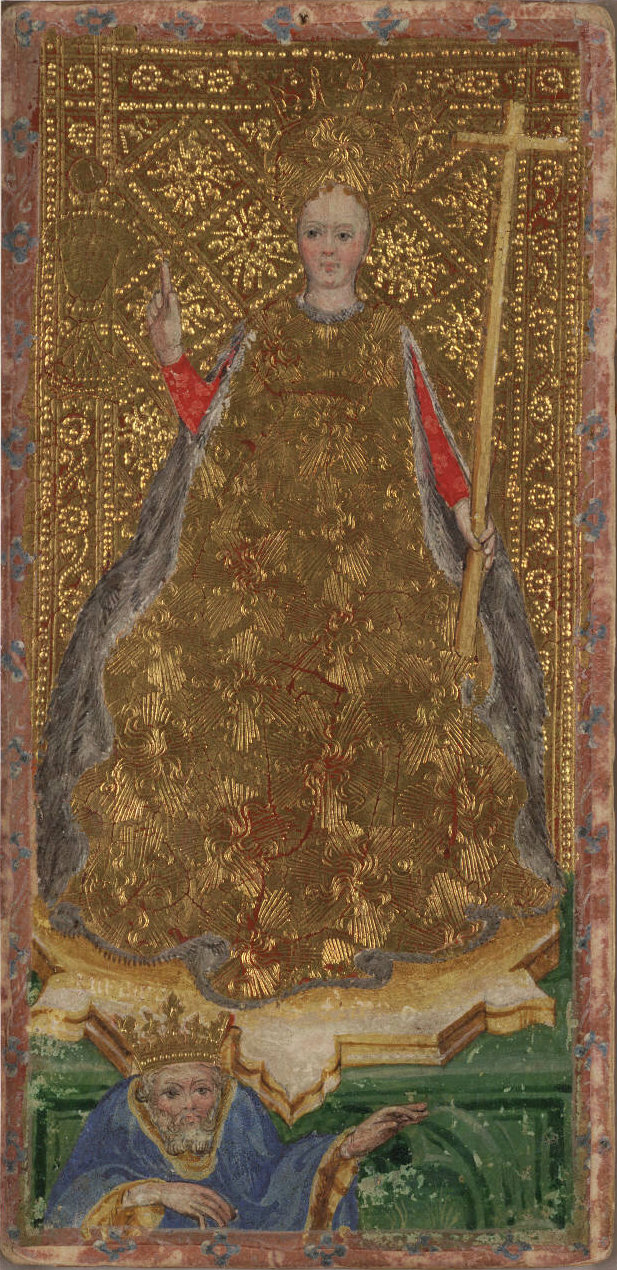
Faith

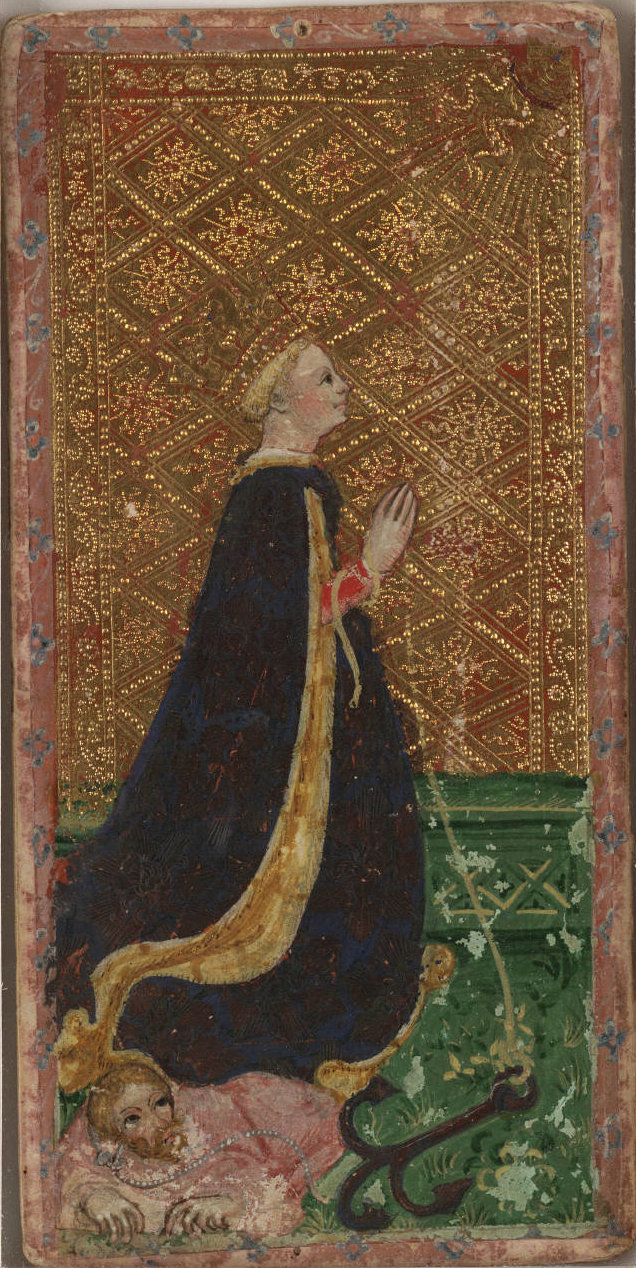
Hope

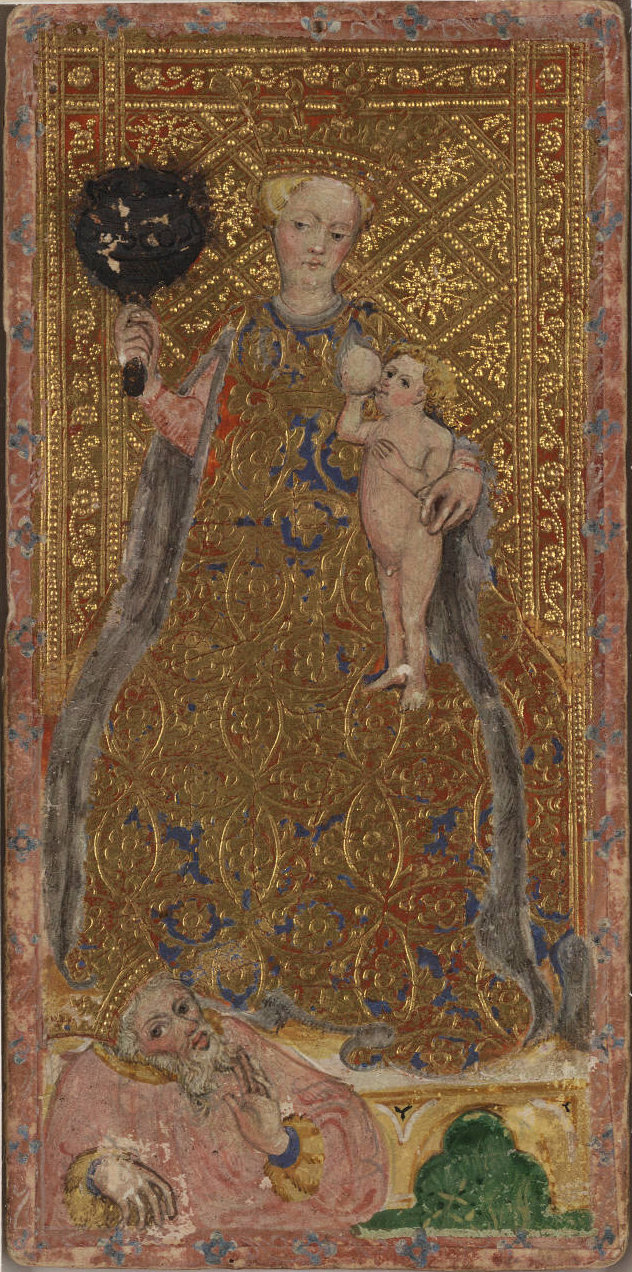
Charity

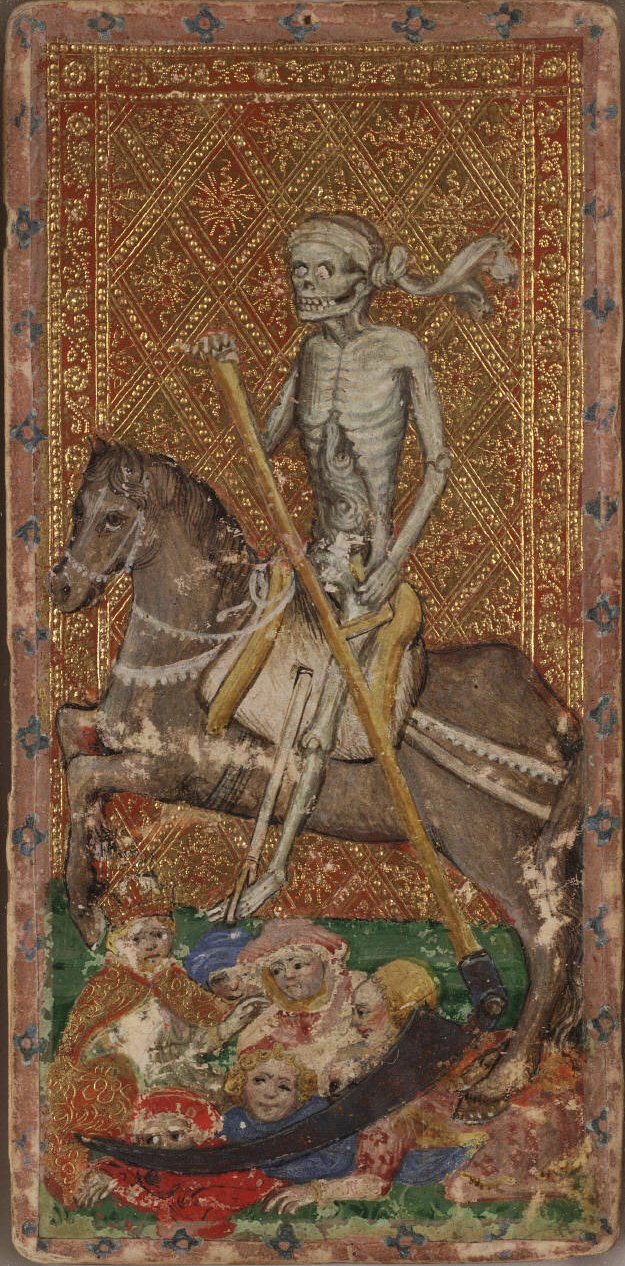
Death

=== Brera–Brambilla ===
This set is named after Giovanni Brambilla, who acquired the cards in Venice in 1900. Since 1971 the deck has been in the catalogue of the Brera Gallery in Milan. Apparently commissioned to Bonifacio Bembo by Francesco Sforza in 1463, it now consists of 48 cards with only two trumps – the Emperor and the Wheel of Fortune. All face cards have a gilt background, while the pip cards have a silver one.

The seven remaining face cards are: Knight and Jack of cups; Knight and Jack of denari; Knight, Jack and Queen of bastoni. Almost all pip cards have survived, as this set is only missing the four of denari.

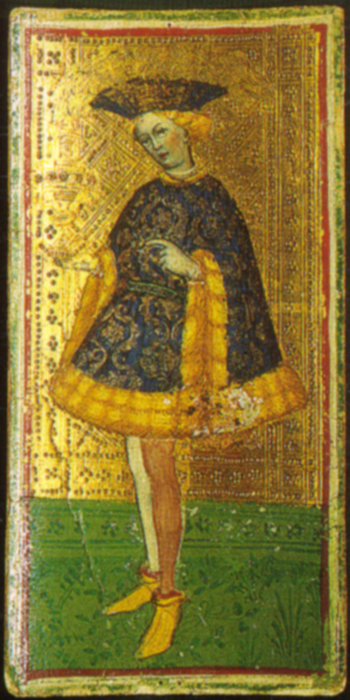
Jack of cups

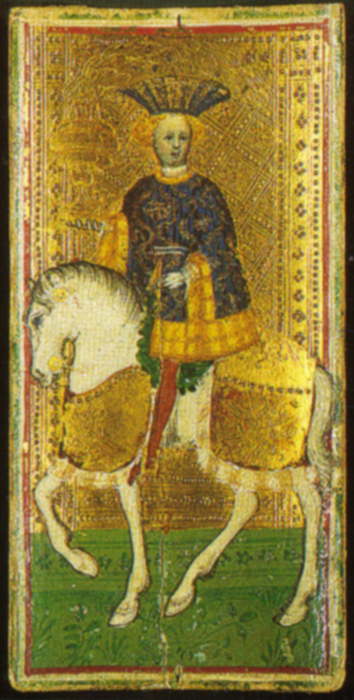
Knight of cups

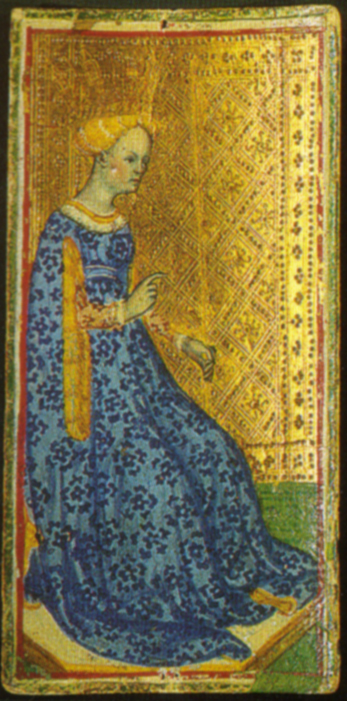
Queen of batons
