= Johann Georg Rauch (politician) =

Swiss businessman and politician

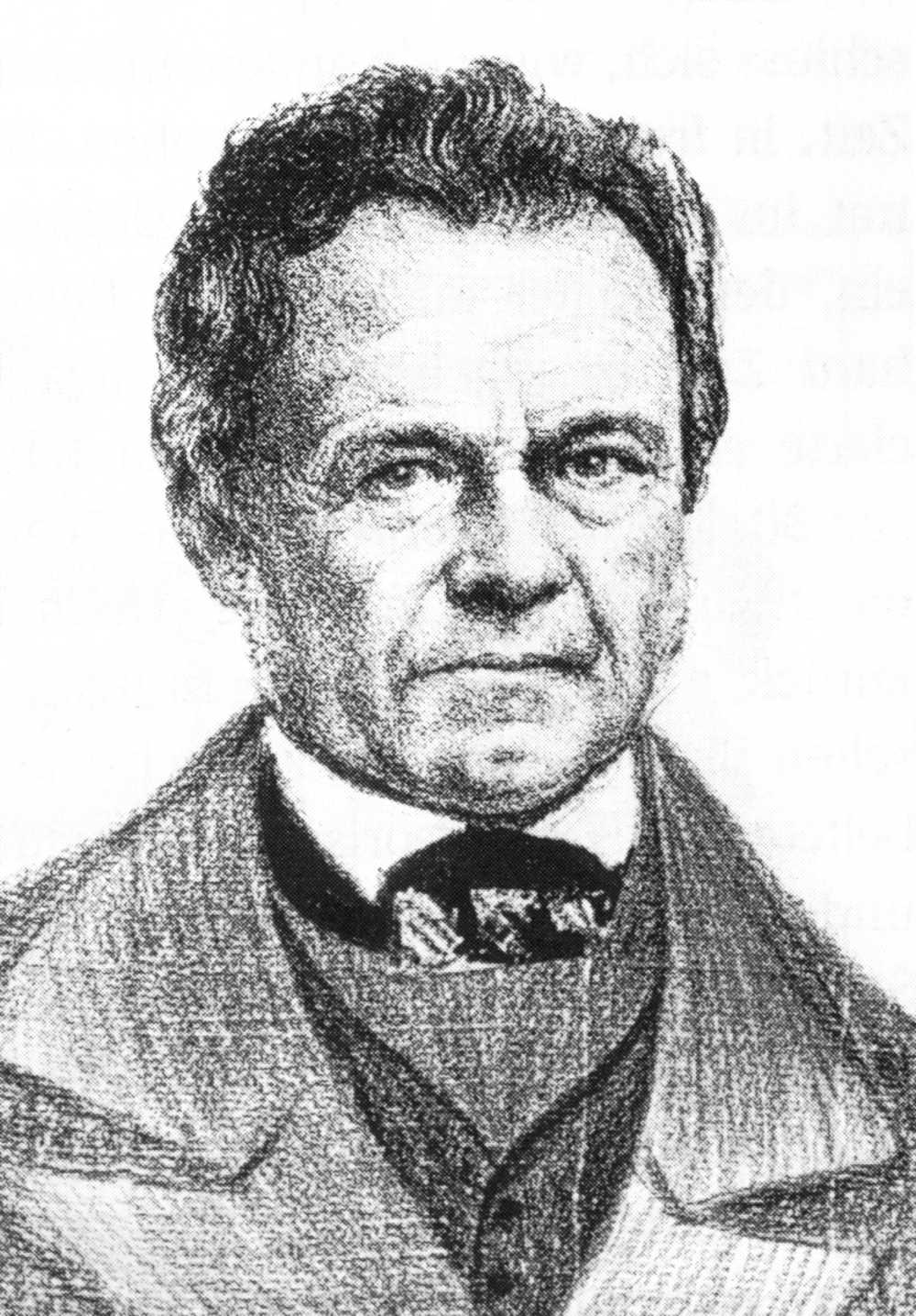
- Born: 18 June 1789; Diessenhofen, Switzerland
- Died: 6 March 1851 (aged 61); Pfyn, Switzerland
- Occupations: businessman, politician
- Known for: playing-card workshop, governor of the district of Diessenhofen
- Notable work: Swiss 1JJ Tarot
- Parents: Hans Georg Rauch (father); Ursula Peter (mother)

Johann Georg Rauch (18 June 1789 – 6 March 1851) was a Swiss businessman and politician.

== Biography ==
Johann Georg Rauch was the son of Ursula Peter and red tanner, Hans Georg Rauch. He was born at Diessenhofen in the Canton of Thurgau Diessenhofen. Nothing is known about his education and vocational training. He embarked on a military career as a young adult. By 1812, he was a captain in the Thurgau "militia contingent". In 1813, he defended the northern Swiss border, fighting under Niklaus Rudolf von Wattenwyl and, in 1814, participated in the defence of the Fort de Joux in Pontarlier, France under the command of Niklaus Franz von Bachmann. In the same year he was transferred to the Swiss regiment of "Ziegler" which was in royal Dutch service. In 1817 he became a battalion adjutant.

On 18 May 1818, he left the regiment and travelled back to Switzerland to Frauenfeld and became a temporary scribe. In 1820, he married Anna Catharina Vogler, daughter of the President of the Court of Appeal, Melchior Vogler. In 1822, he was promoted to Registrar of the State Chancellery. 1829 he was married again, this time to priest's daughter Anna Katharina Wirz. On 9 June 1830, he was appointed as successor of his father to the district officer (Kreisamtsmann) and so he gave up the position as registrar and moved back to Diessenhofen. In 1830, Johann Georg Rauch was elected to Grand Council of Thurgau (Grosser Rat) where he remained until his death in 1851.

In 1831, he bought a playing-card factory from Johann Bernhard Zündel, who had also served in the Swiss regiment "Ziegler" in the Netherlands. He took over the entire staff and moved the workshop from Schaffhausen to his house on Rheinstrasse in Diessenhofen. For this he had to have his house extensively rebuilt, and so the value of the property increased by 30 percent.

His playing-card workshop developed the first version of the Swiss 1JJ Tarot from the Tarot de Besançon, which is still used today for the Swiss Tarock games Troccas and Troggu. It was the first Tarock game produced by the card workshop. In 1838, he sold the company on to Johannes Müller, who had already completed his apprenticeship there.

In 1831, he became a justice of the peace of the Diessenhofen district and a criminal judge. From 1832 to 1837, he was a councillor of war (Kriegsrat). He remained a criminal judge until 1841 and a justice of the peace until 1842. From 1842 until his death he was governor of the district of Diessenhofen.

In 1848, he was elected to the Nationalrat in the newly founded federal state during Switzerland's first parliamentary elections. He put his political emphasis on the interests of the trade and craftsmen. In 1849, he became member of the constitutional commission on the cantonal council.

In Pfyn Johann Georg Rauch worked from 1850 as tax commissioner of Steckborn District. He died of a heart attack on 6 March 1851 in Pfyn.

== Literature ==
- Ruh, Max (2005). Schaffhauser Spielkarten. Schweizer Pioniere der Wirtschaft und Technik. Verein für wirtschaftshistorische Studien, Zürich 2005, ISBN 3-909059-32-5.
