= Tarot =

Cards used for games or divination

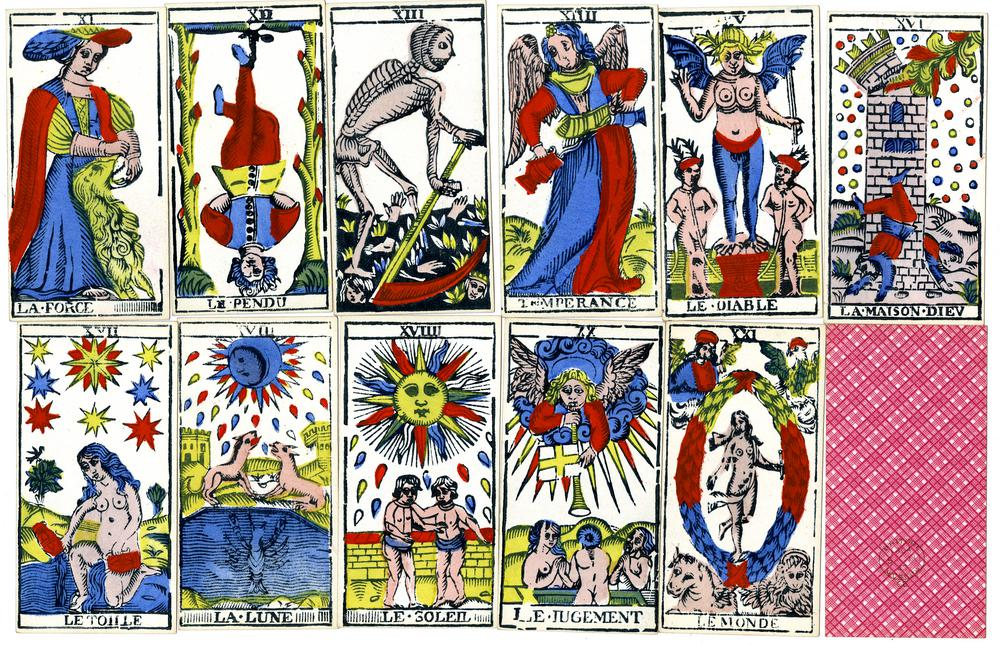
Trumps of the Tarot de Marseilles, a standard 18th-century playing card pack, later also used for divination

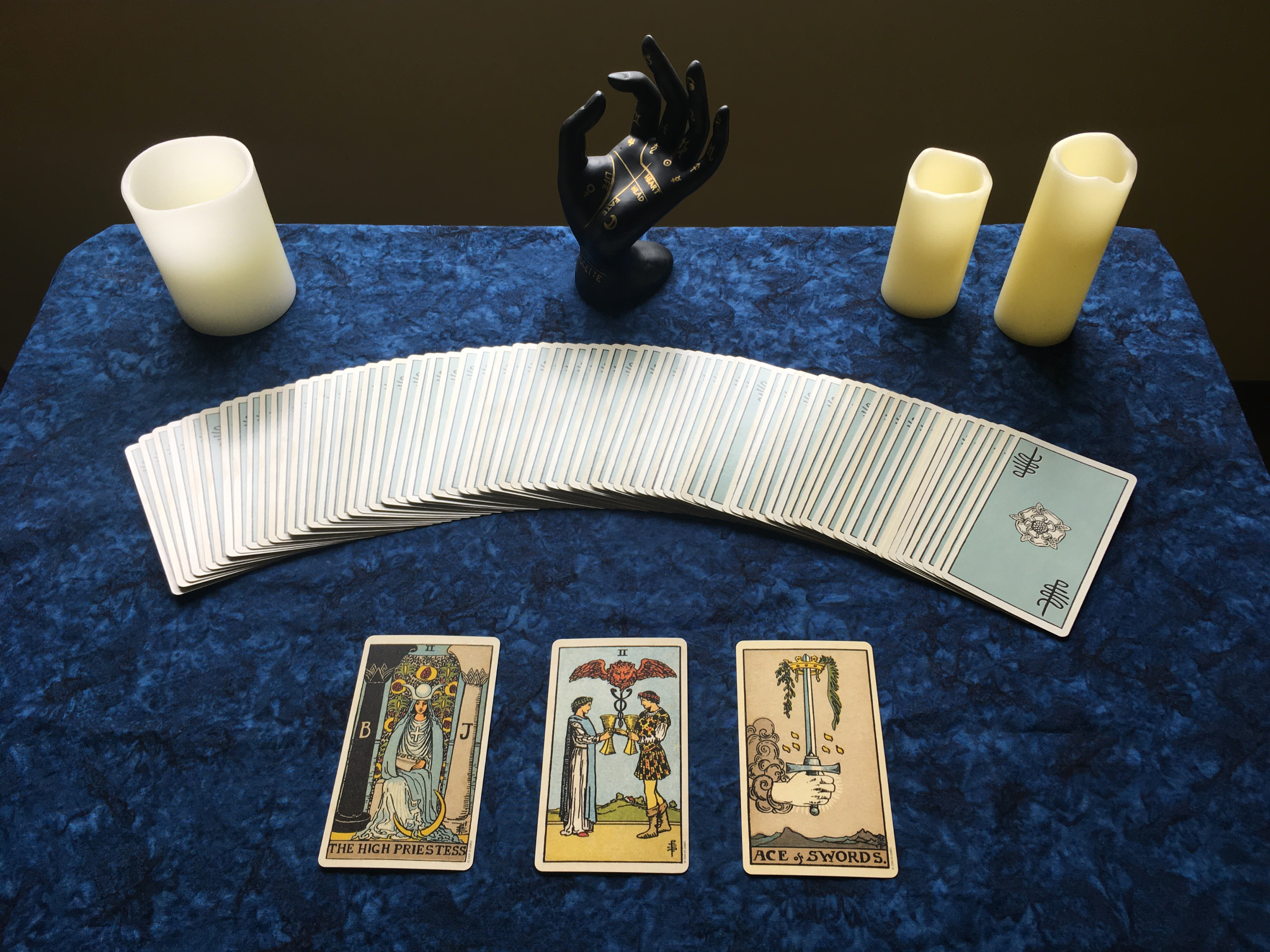
A 3-card tarot spread used for divination. The deck is the Smith-Waite Centennial Tarot Deck (a faithful reproduction of the original Rider-Waite-Smith deck from 1909).

Tarot (/ˈtæroʊ/, first known as trionfi and later as tarocchi or tarocks) is a set of playing cards used in Tarot card games and fortune-telling or divination. From at least the mid-15th century, the tarot was used to play trick-taking card games such as Tarocchini. From their Italian roots, tarot games spread to most of Europe, evolving into new forms including German Grosstarok and modern examples such as French Tarot and Austrian Königrufen.

Tarot is commonly found in many countries, especially in English- and Spanish-speaking countries where tarot games are not as widely played, in the form of specially designed cartomantic decks used primarily for tarot card reading, in which each card corresponds to an assigned archetype or interpretation for divination, fortune-telling or for other non-gaming uses.

The emergence of custom decks for use in divination via tarot card reading and cartomancy began after French occultists made elaborate, but unsubstantiated, claims about their history and meaning in the late 18th century. Thus, there are two distinct types of tarot packs in circulation: those used for card games and those used for divination. However, some older patterns, such as the Tarot de Marseille and the Swiss 1JJ Tarot, originally intended for playing card games, are also used for cartomancy.

Tarot has four suits that vary by region: French suits are used in western, central and eastern Europe, and Latin suits in southern Europe. Each suit has 14 cards: ten pip cards numbering from one (or Ace) to ten; and four face cards: King, Queen, Knight, and Jack/Knave/Page. In addition, the tarot also has a separate 21-card trump suit and a single card known as the Fool. Depending on the game, the Fool may act as the top trump or may be played to avoid following suit. These tarot cards are still used throughout much of Europe to play trick-taking card games.

== Distribution ==
The use of tarot for trick-taking games was at one time widespread across the whole of Europe except the British Isles, the Iberian Peninsula, and the Balkans. Having fallen into decline by the 20th century, the games later experienced a renaissance in some countries and regions. For example, French Tarot was largely confined to Provence in the 18th century, but took off in the 1950s to such an extent that, in 1973, the French Tarot Association (Fédération Française de Tarot) was formed and French Tarot itself is now the second most popular card game in France. Tarock games like Königrufen have experienced significant growth in Austria where international tournaments are held with other nations, especially those from eastern Europe that still play such games, including Hungary, Romania, Slovakia and Slovenia.

Denmark appears to be the only Scandinavian country that still plays tarot games, Danish Tarok being a derivative of historical German Grosstarock. The game of Cego has grown in popularity again in the south German region of Baden. Italy continues to play regionally popular games with their distinctive Tarot packs. These include: Ottocento in Bologna and Sicilian Tarocchi in parts of Sicily. Meanwhile Troccas and Troggu are still played locally in parts of Switzerland.

== History ==
=== Playing cards ===
Tarot cards, then known as tarocchi (Italian), first appeared in Ferrara and Milan in northern Italy, with the Fool and 21 trumps (then called trionfi) being added to the standard Italian pack of four suits: batons, coins, cups and swords. Scholarship has established that early European playing cards were probably based on the Egyptian Mamluk deck invented in or before the 14th century, which followed the introduction of paper from Asia into Western Europe. By the late 1300s, Europeans were producing their own cards, the earliest patterns being based on the Mamluk deck but with variations to the suit symbols and court cards.

The first records of playing cards in Europe date to 1367 in Bern and they appear to have spread very rapidly across the whole of Europe, as may be seen from the records, mainly of card games being banned. Little is known about the appearance and number of these cards, the only significant information being provided by a text by John of Rheinfelden in 1377 from Freiburg im Breisgau, who, in addition to other versions, describes the basic pack as containing the still-current 4 suits of 13 cards, the courts usually being the King, Ober and Unter ("marshals"), although Dames and Queens were already known by then.

An early pattern of playing cards used the suits of batons or clubs, coins, swords, and cups. These suits are still used in traditional Italian, Spanish and Portuguese playing card decks, and are also used in modern (occult) tarot divination cards that first appeared in the late 18th century.

=== Early tarot decks ===
A lost tarot-like pack was commissioned by Duke Filippo Maria Visconti and described by Martiano da Tortona, probably between 1418 and 1425 since the painter he mentions, Michelino da Besozzo, returned to Milan in 1418, while Martiano himself died in 1425. He described a 60-card deck with 16 cards having images of the Roman gods and suits depicting four kinds of birds. The 16 cards were regarded as "trumps" since, in 1449, Jacopo Antonio Marcello recalled that the now deceased duke had invented a novum quoddam et exquisitum triumphorum genus, or "a new and exquisite kind of triumphs." Other early decks showcasing classical motifs include the Boiardo–Viti and Sola Busca tarots of the 1490s.

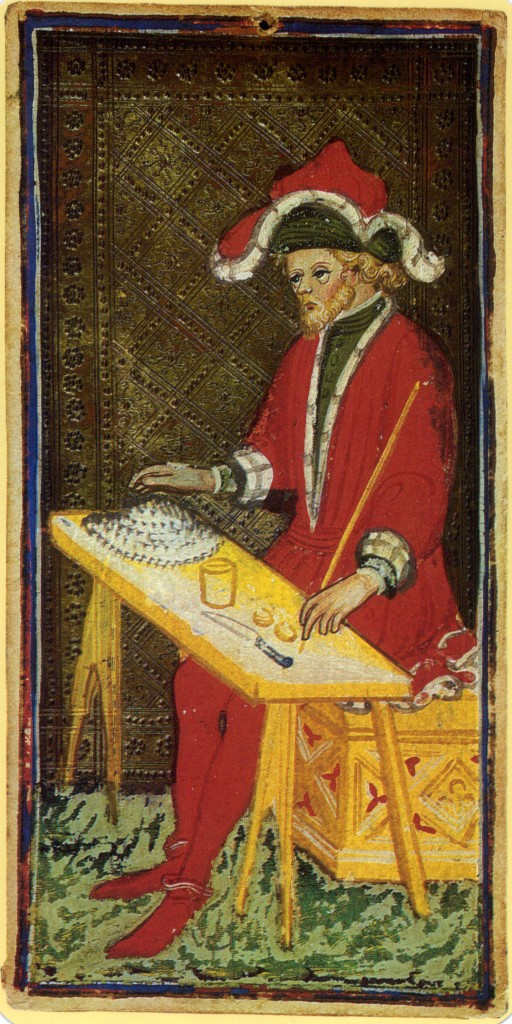
The juggler from the Pierpont Morgan Bergamo Visconti-Sforza pack

The first documented tarot decks were recorded between 1440 and 1450 in Milan, Ferrara, Florence and Bologna, when additional trump cards with allegorical illustrations were added to the common four-suit pack. These new decks were called carte da trionfi, triumph cards, and the additional cards known simply as trionfi, which became "trumps" in English. The earliest documentation of trionfi is found in a written statement in the court records of Florence, in 1440, regarding the transfer of two decks to Sigismondo Pandolfo Malatesta.

The oldest surviving tarot cards are the 15 or so decks of the Visconti-Sforza Tarot painted in the mid-15th century for the rulers of the Duchy of Milan. In 15th century Italy, the set of cards that was included in tarot packs, including trumps, seems to have been consistent, even if naming and ordering varied. There are two main exceptions:

- Some late 15th-century decks like the Sola Busca tarot and the Boiardo deck had four suits, a fool, and 21 trumps, but none of the trump images match the images normally used on Italian tarot cards. They seem to have been made on the model of tarot decks, but were voluntary departures from an established standard.
- The Visconti di Mondrone pack, one of the Visconti-Sforza decks, originally had a Dame and a Maid in each suit, in addition to the standard King, Queen, Knight, and Jack. Additionally, the pack includes three trump cards which represent the theological virtues of Faith, Hope, and Charity, and are not present in any other tarot deck of that era.

Although a Dominican preacher inveighed against the evil inherent in playing cards, chiefly because of their use in gambling, in a sermon in the 15th century, no routine condemnations of tarot were found during its early history.

=== Propagation ===
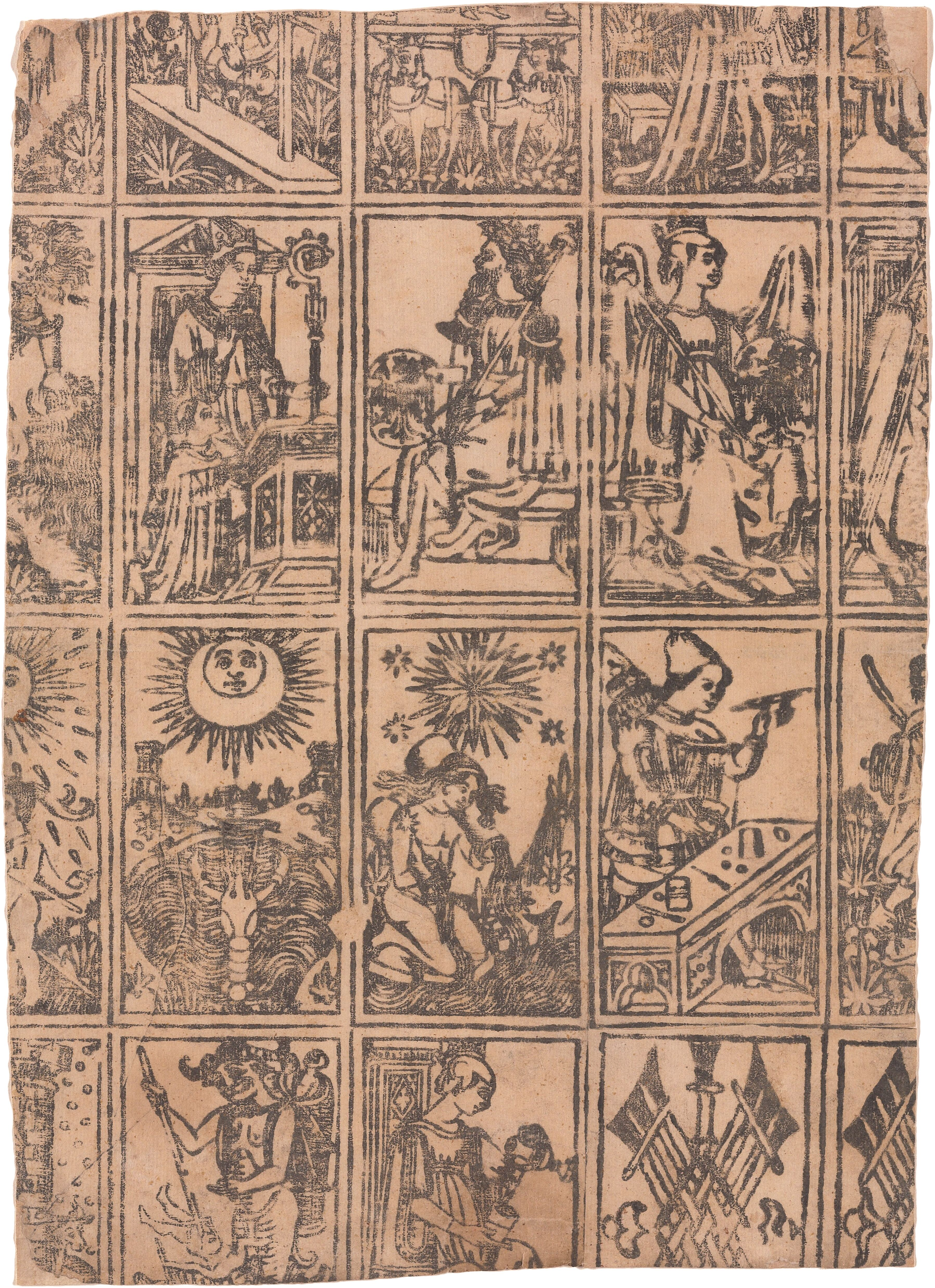
The Cary sheet, a partial uncut sheet of Milanese tarocchi, c. 1500

Because the earliest tarot cards were hand-painted, the number of the decks produced is thought to have been small. It was only after the invention of the printing press that mass production of cards became possible. The expansion of tarot outside of Italy, first to France and Switzerland, occurred during the Italian Wars. The most prominent tarot deck version used in these two countries was the Tarot of Marseilles, of Milanese origin. The oldest Tarot deck produced in Marseille is that of Philippe Vachier, dated 1639.

While the set of trumps was generally consistent, their order varied by region, perhaps as early as the 1440s. Michael Dummett placed them into three categories. In Bologna and Florence, the highest trump is the Angel, followed by the World. This group spread mainly southward through the Papal States, the Kingdom of Naples, and finally down to the Kingdom of Sicily but was also known in the Savoyard states. In Ferrara, the World was the highest, followed by Justice and the Angel. This group spread mainly to the northeast to Venice and Trento where it was only a passing fad. By the end of the 16th century, this order became extinct. In Milan, the World was highest, followed by the Angel; this ordering is used in the Tarot of Marseilles. Dummett also wrote about a possible fourth lineage that may have existed along the Franco-Italian border. It spread north through France until its last descendant, the Belgian Tarot, went extinct around 1800.

In Florence, an expanded deck called Minchiate was later used. This deck of 97 cards includes astrological symbols and the four elements, as well as traditional tarot motifs. The earliest known mention of this game, under the name of germini, dates to 1506.

== Etymology ==
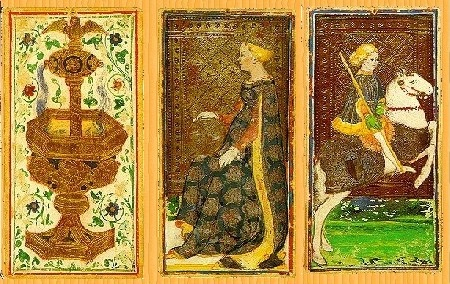
Three cards from a Visconti-Sforza tarot deck: Ace of cups, Queen of coins and the Knight of batons

The word "tarot" and German Tarock derive from the Italian Tarocchi, the origin of which is uncertain, although taroch was used as a synonym for foolishness in the late 15th and early 16th centuries. The decks were known exclusively as Trionfi during the fifteenth century. The new name first appeared in Brescia around 1502 as Tarocho. During the 16th century, a new game played with a standard deck but sharing a very similar name (Trionfa) was quickly becoming popular. This coincided with the older game being renamed tarocchi. In modern Italian, the singular term is Tarocco, which, as a noun, is a cultivar of blood orange. The attribute Tarocco and the verb Taroccare are used regionally to indicate that something is fake or forged. This meaning is directly derived from the tarocchi game as played in Italy, in which tarocco indicates a card that can be played in place of another card.

== Playing card decks ==
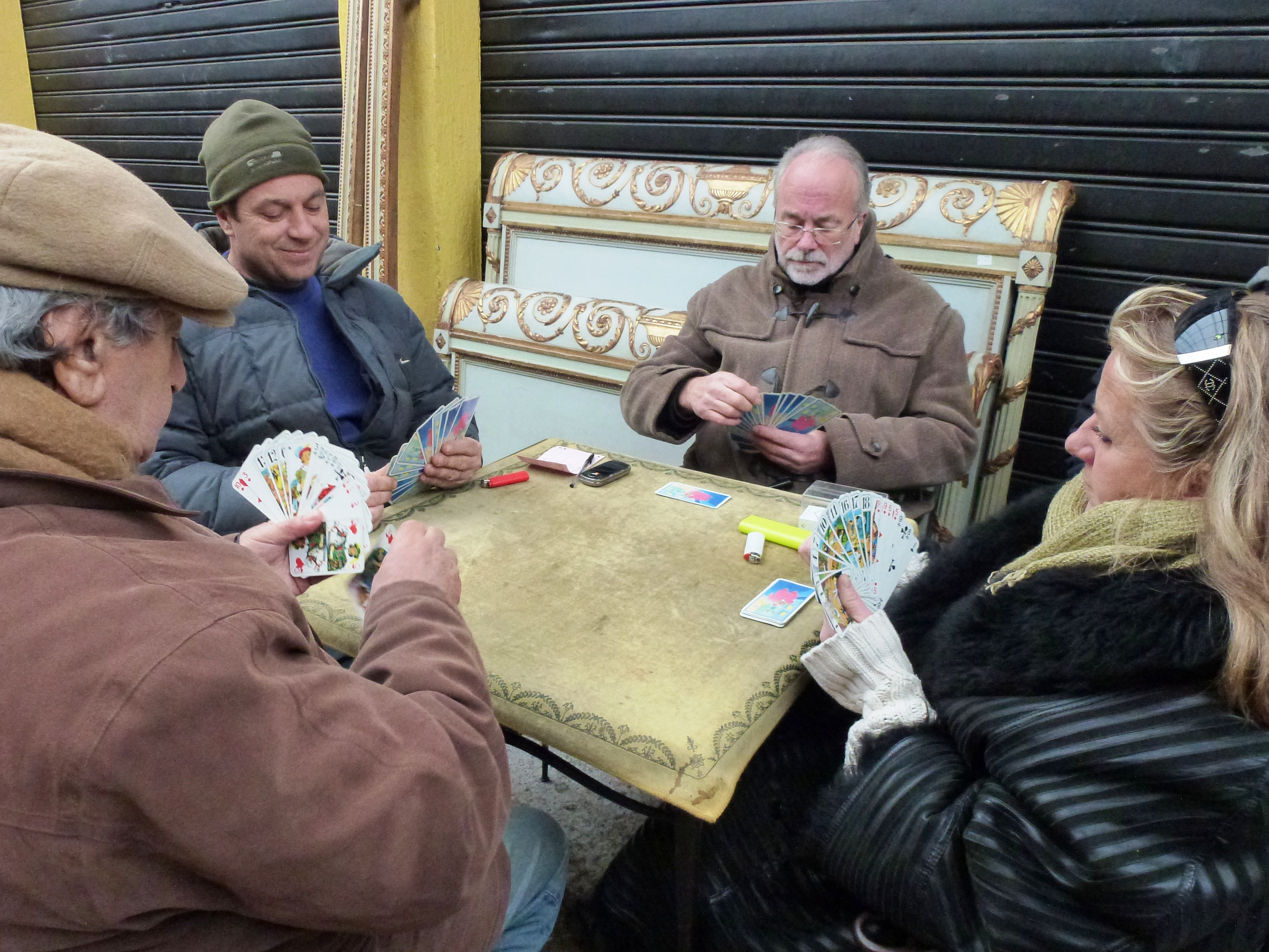
A French tarot game in session

The original purpose of tarot cards was to play games. A very cursory explanation of rules for a tarot-like deck is given in a manuscript by Martiano da Tortona before 1425. Vague descriptions of game play or game terminology follow for the next two centuries until the earliest known complete description of rules for a French variant in 1637. The game of tarot has many regional variations. Tarocchini has survived in Bologna and there are still others played in Piedmont and Sicily, but in Italy the game is generally less popular than elsewhere.

The 18th century saw tarot's greatest revival, during which it became one of the most popular card games in Europe, played everywhere except Ireland and Britain, the Iberian peninsula, and the Ottoman Balkans. French tarot experienced another revival, beginning in the 1970s, and France has the strongest tarot gaming community. Regional tarot games—often known as tarock, tarok, or tarokk—are widely played in central Europe within the borders of the former Austro-Hungarian empire.

=== Italian-suited decks ===
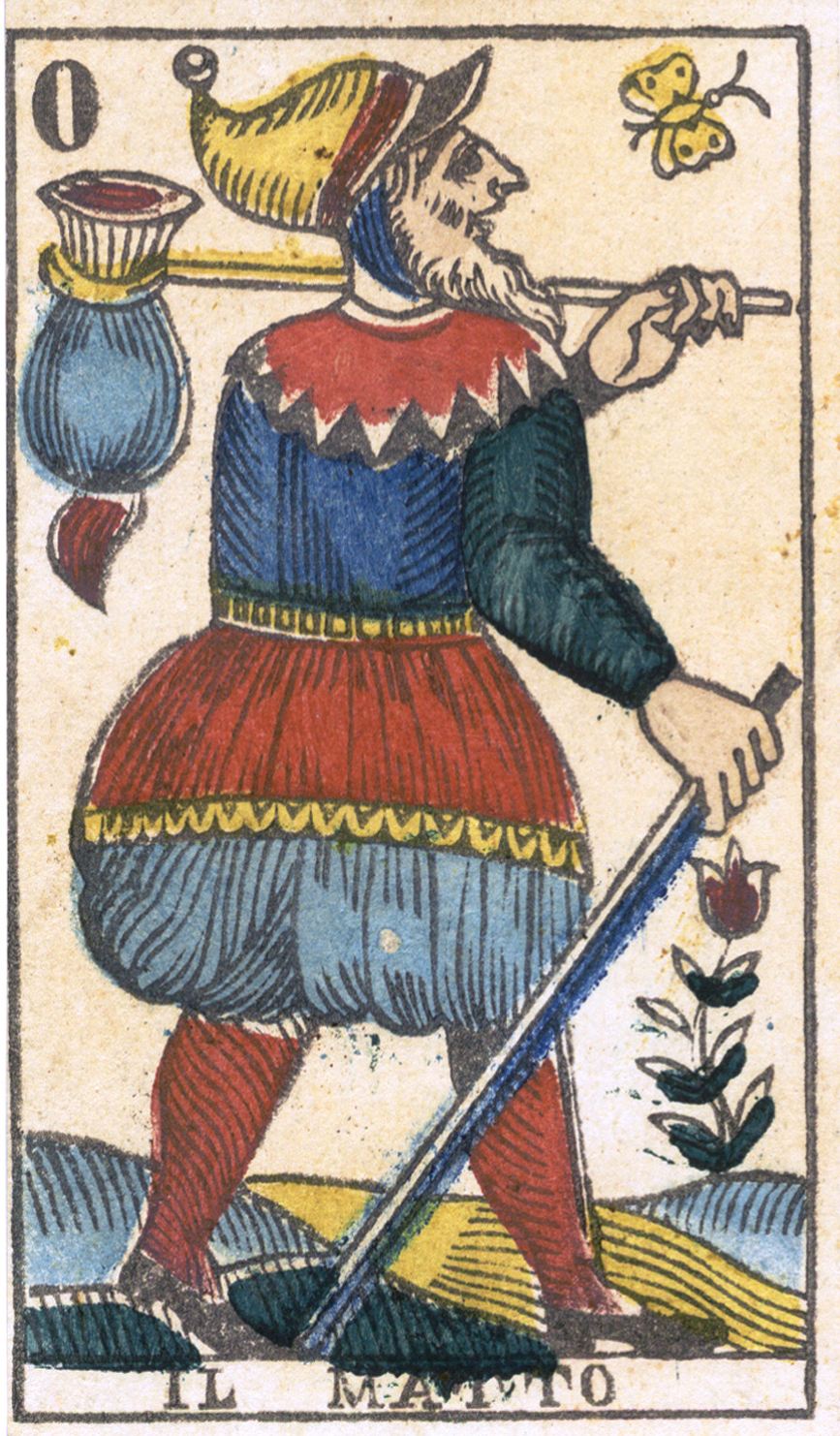
Tarocco Piemontese: the Fool card

Italian-suited decks were first devised in the 15th century in northern Italy. Three decks of this category are still used to play certain games:

- The Tarocco Piemontese consists of the four suits of swords, batons, cups and coins, each headed by a king, queen, cavalier and jack, followed by the pip cards for a total of 78 cards. Trump 20 outranks 21 in most games and the Fool is numbered 0 despite not being a trump.
- The Swiss 1JJ Tarot is similar, but replaces the Pope with Jupiter, the Popess with Juno, and the Angel with the Judgement. The trumps rank in numerical order and the Tower is known as the House of God. The cards are not reversible like the Tarocco Piemontese.
- The Tarocco Bolognese omits numeral cards two to five in plain suits, leaving it with 62 cards, and has somewhat different trumps, not all of which are numbered and four of which are equal in rank. It has a different graphical design than the two above as it was not derived from the Tarot of Marseilles.

=== Italo-Portuguese-suited deck ===
The Tarocco Siciliano is the only deck to use the so-called Portuguese suit system, which uses Spanish pips but intersects them like Italian pips. Some of the trumps are different such as the lowest trump, Miseria (destitution). It omits the Two and Three of coins, and numerals one to four in clubs, swords and cups: it thus has 64 cards, but the ace of coins is not used, being the bearer of the former stamp tax. The cards are quite small and not reversible.^{[9]}

=== Spanish-suited deck ===
The sole surviving example of a Spanish-suited deck was produced around 1820 by Giacomo Recchi of Oneglia, Liguria and destined for Sardinia. The plain suit cards are copied from the Sardinian pattern designed just ten years earlier by José Martinez de Castro for Clemente Roxas in Madrid but with the addition of 10s and queens. The trumps are largely copied from an early version of the Tarocco Piemontese. At that time, Liguria, Sardinia, and Piedmont were all territories of the Savoyard state.

=== French-suited decks ===
French suited tarot cards use the suit signs of clubs, diamonds, hearts, and spades. With the exception of novelty decks, French-suited tarot cards are almost exclusively used for card games. The earliest French-suited tarot decks were made by the de Poilly family of engravers, beginning with a Minchiate deck by François de Poilly in the late 1650s. Aside from these early outliers, the first generation of French-suited tarots depicted scenes of animals on the trumps and were thus called "Tiertarock" (Tier being German for "animal") and first appeared around 1740. Around 1800, a greater variety of decks were produced, mostly with genre art or veduta. The German states used to produce a variety of 78-card tarot packs using Italian suits, but later switching to French suited cards; some were imported to France. There remain only two French-suited patterns of Cego packs - the Cego Adler pack manufactured by ASS Altenburger and one with genre scenes by F.X. Schmid, which may reflect the mainstream German cards of the 19th century. Current French-suited tarot decks come in these patterns:

- Industrie und Glück – the Industrie und Glück ("Diligence and Fortune" (Note: "Diligence and Fortune" is the contemporary meaning of the phrase Industrie und Glück. See, for example, Placardi, Carl (1766). Das Kaiserliche Sprach- und Wörterbuch, Cölln am Rhein: Metternich, pp. 72 and 83.)) genre art tarock deck of Central Europe uses Roman numerals for the trumps. It is sold with 54 cards; the 5 to 10 of the red suits and the 1 to 6 of the black suits are removed. There are 3 patterns – Types A, B and C – of which Type C has become the standard, whereas Types A and B appear in limited editions or specials.
- Tarot Nouveau – also called the Tarot Bourgeois – has a 78-card pack. It is commonly used for tarot games in France and for Danish Tarok in Denmark. It is also sometimes used in Germany to play Cego. Its genre art trumps use Arabic numerals in corner indices.
- Adler-Cego – this is an animal tarot that is used in the Upper Rhine valley and neighbouring mountain regions such as the Black Forest or the Vosges It has 54 cards organized in the same fashion as the Industrie und Glück packs. Its trumps use Arabic numerals but within centered indices.
- Schmid-Cego - this pack by F.X. Schmid is of the Bourgeois Tarot type and has genre scenes similar to those of the Tarot Nouveau, but the Arabic numerals are centred as in the Adler-Cego pack.

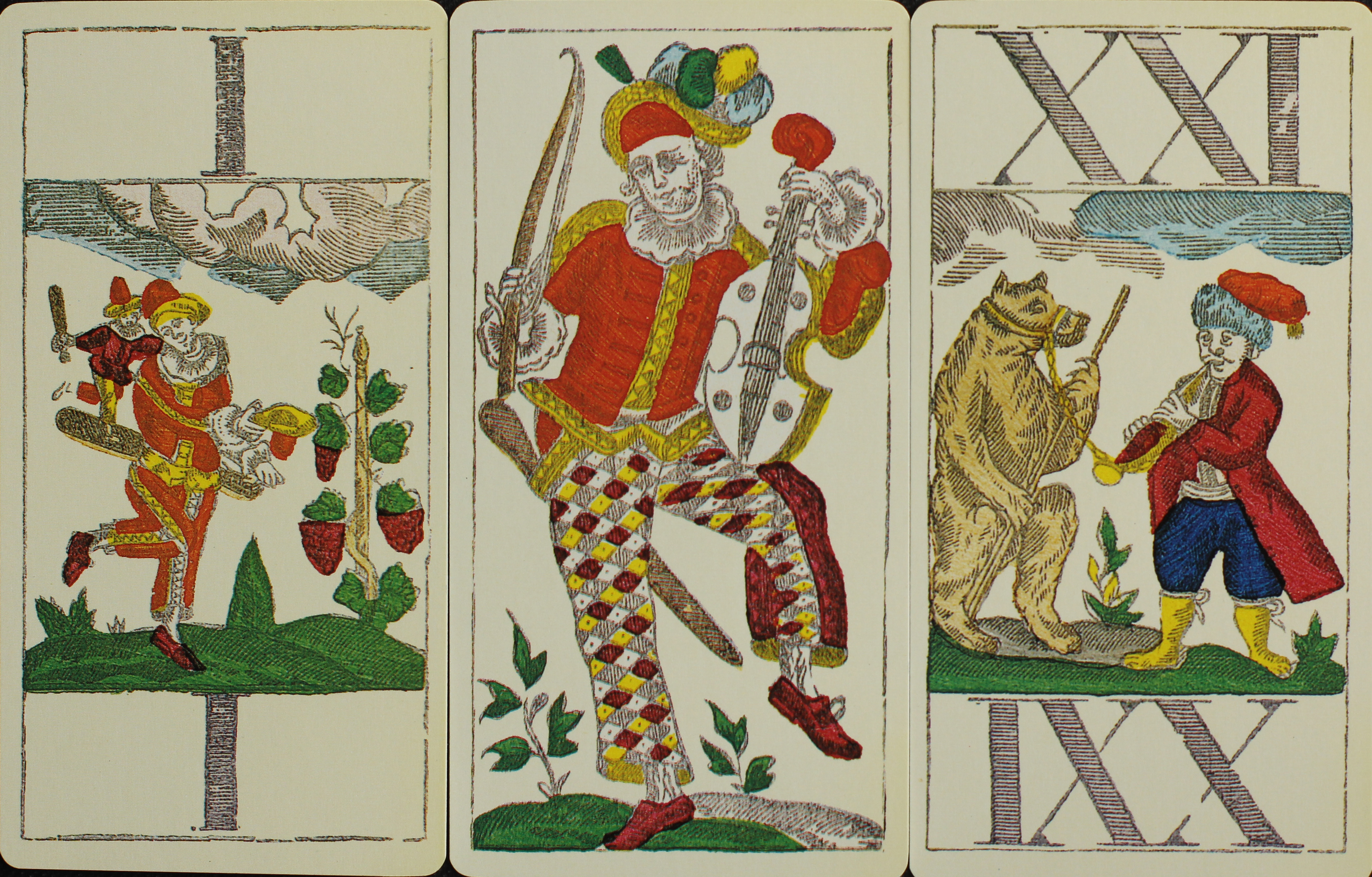
18th century Animal Tarot

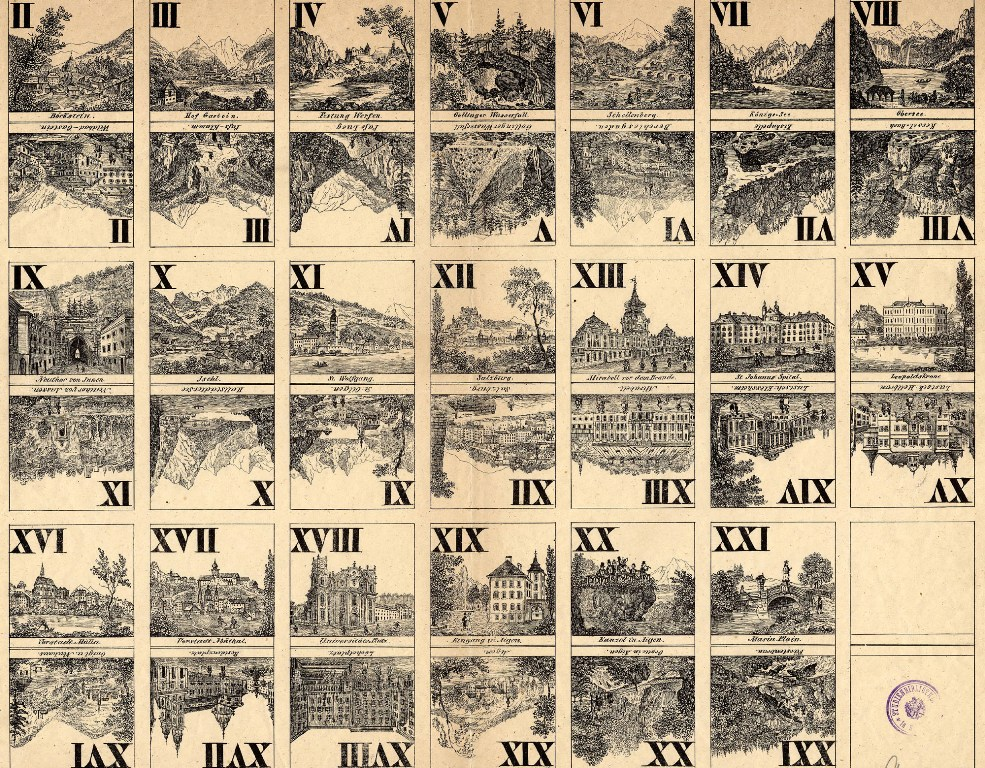
Salzburg veduta trumps, c. 1840

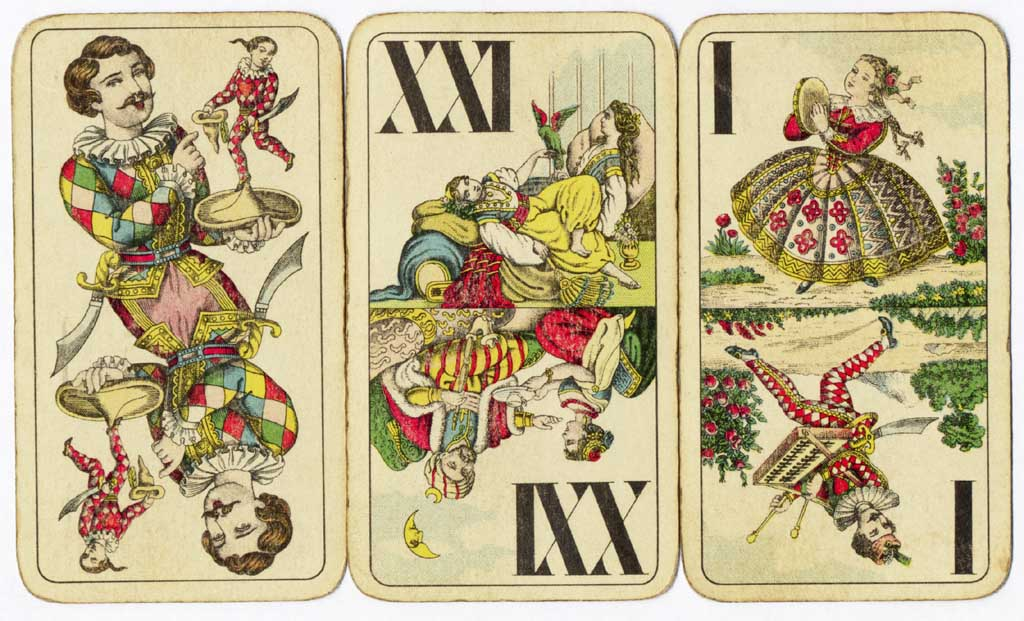
Industrie und Glück Tarock trumps

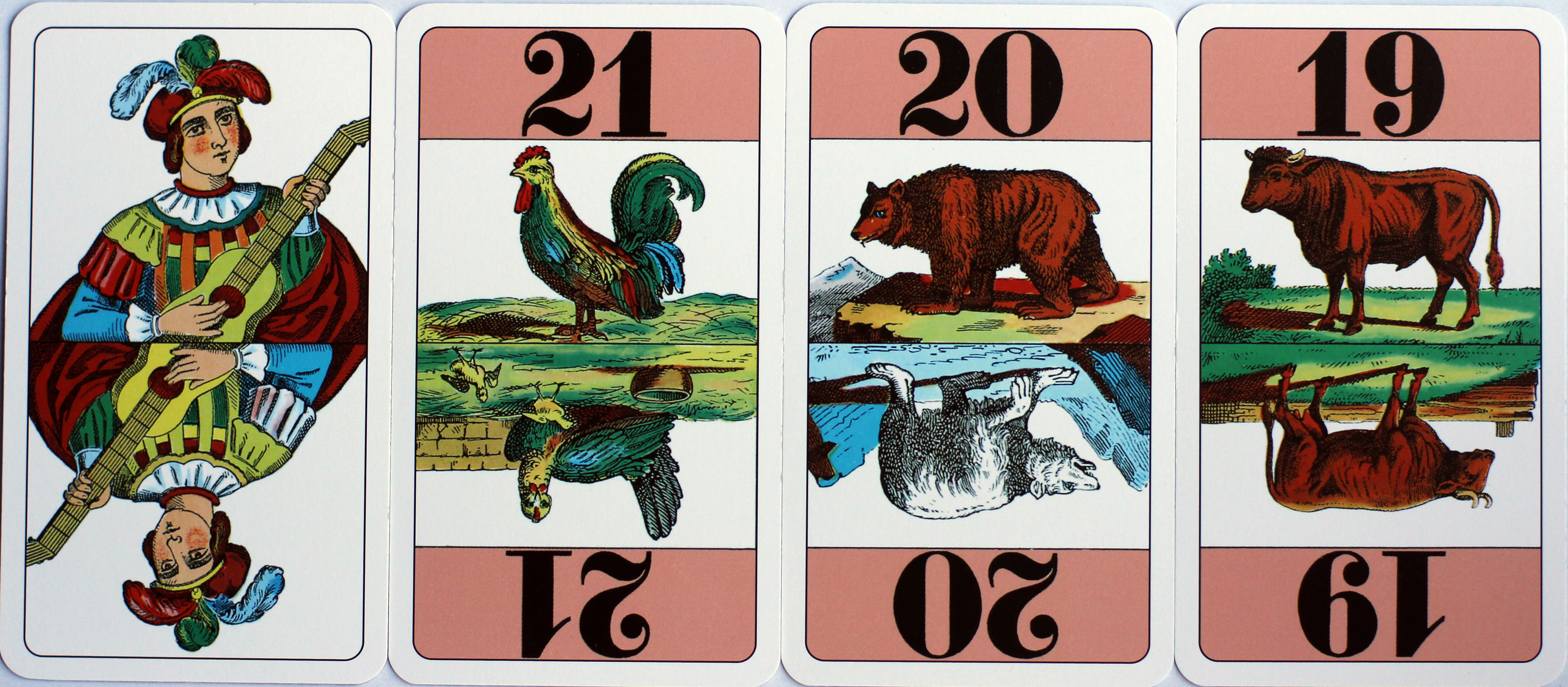
Adler Cego trumps

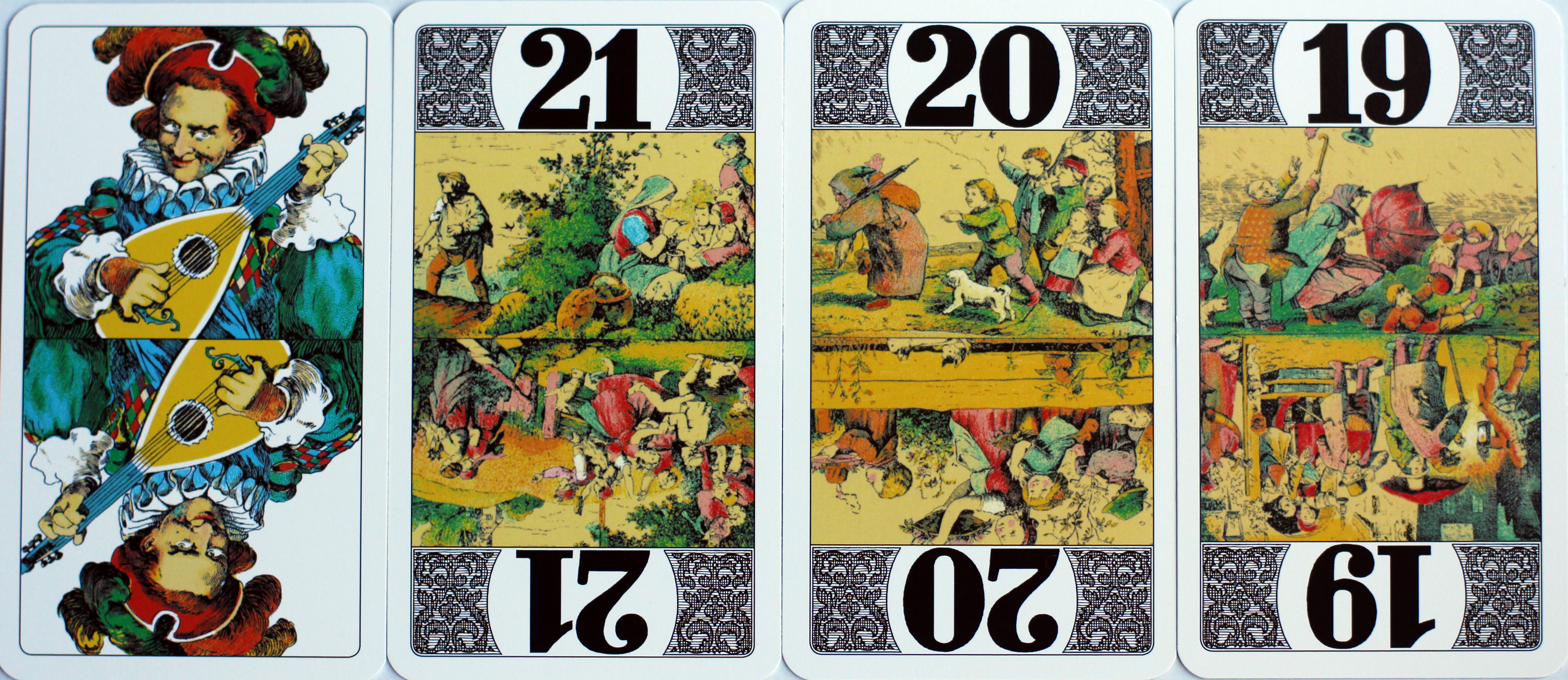
Cego Bourgeois Tarot

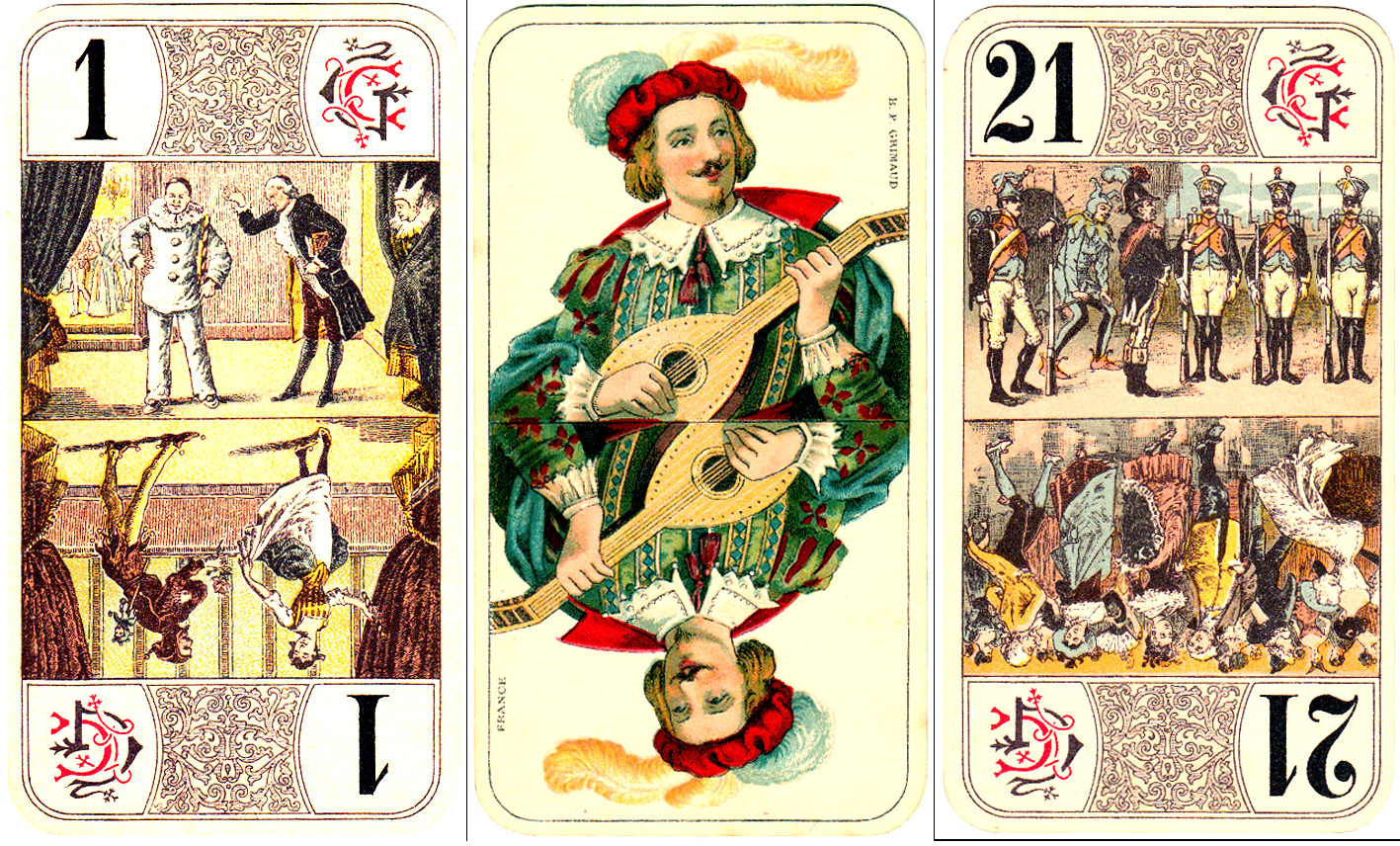
Tarot Nouveau trumps c. 1910

=== German-suited Tarock cards ===
From the late 18th century, in addition to producing their own true Tarot packs, the south German states manufactured German-suited packs labeled "Taroc", "Tarock" or "Deutsch-Tarok". These survive as "Schafkopf/Tarock" packs of the Bavarian and Franconian pattern. These are not true tarot packs, but standard 36-card German-suited decks for games like German Tarok, Bauerntarock, Württemberg Tarock and Bavarian Tarock. Until the 1980s there were also Tarock packs in the Württemberg pattern. There are 36 cards; the pip cards ranging from 6 to 10, Under Knave (Unter), Over Knave (Ober), King, and Ace. These use ace–ten ranking, like klaverjas, where ace is the highest followed by 10, king, Ober, Unter, then 9 to 6. The heart suit is the default trump suit. The Bavarian pack is also used to play Schafkopf by excluding the Sixes.

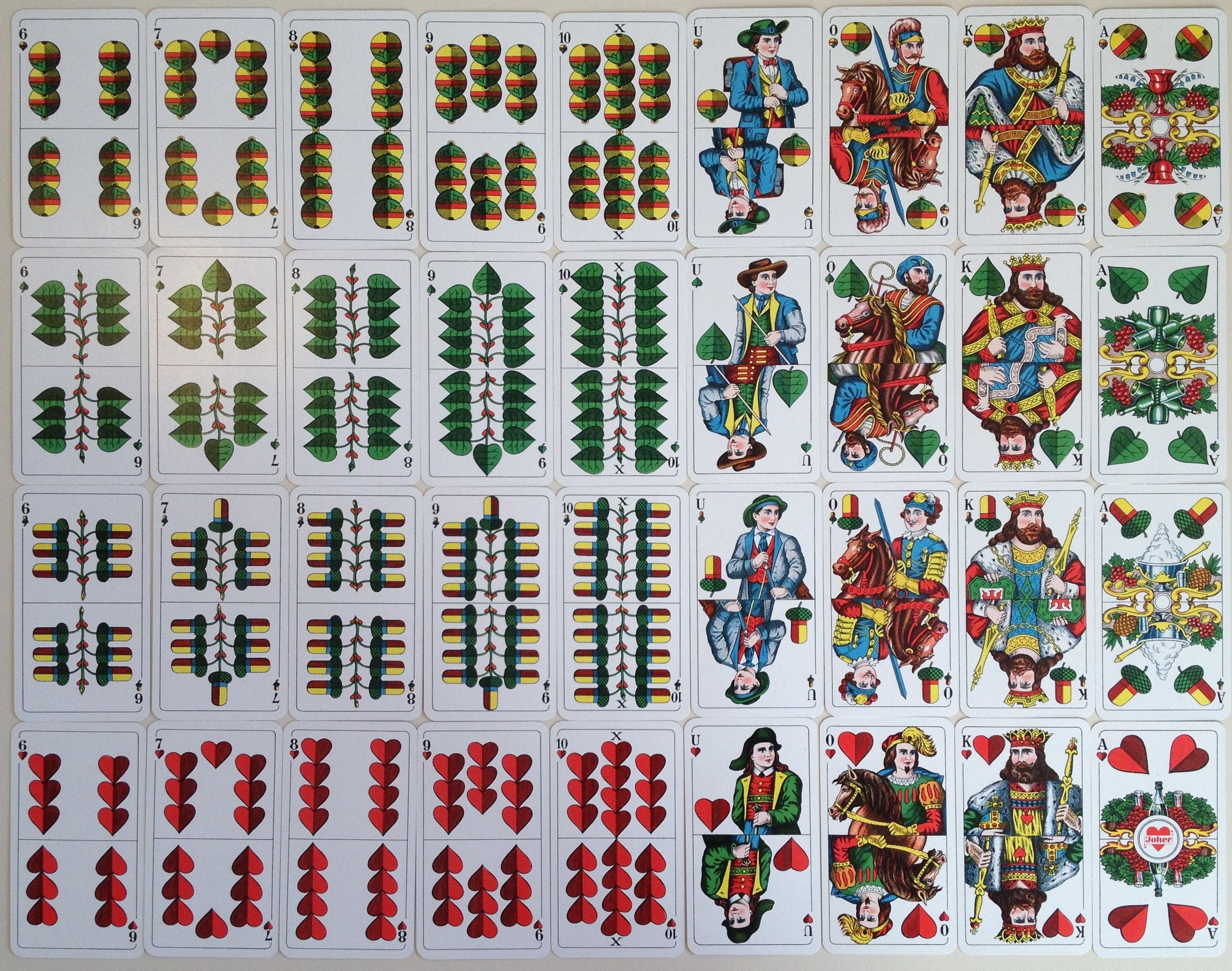
Württemberg Tarock cards

== Cartomancy ==
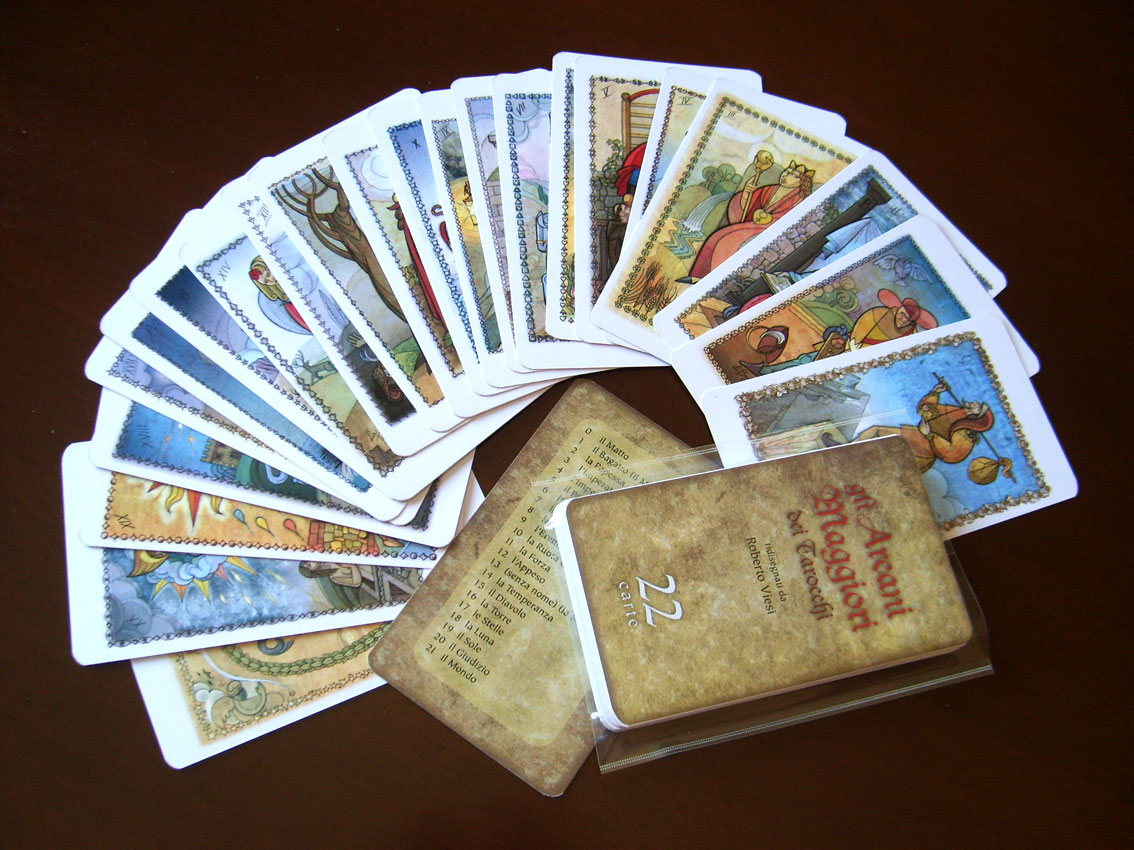
Deck of the 22 Major Arcana cards inspired by the Tarot of Marseilles, but with the author's graphic style

In countries where tarot trick taking games are not widely played, such as English-speaking countries, only specially designed cartomantic tarot cards, used primarily for novelty and divination, are readily available. The early French occultists claimed that tarot cards had esoteric links to ancient Egypt, Kabbalah, the Indic Tantra, or I Ching, claims that have been frequently repeated by authors on card divination. However, scholarly research has demonstrated that tarot cards were invented in northern Italy in the mid-15th century and confirmed that there is no historical evidence of any significant use of tarot cards for divination until the late 18th century. The tarot's esoteric ties and obscured origins proposed in theories by freemasons and occultists during this period led to the implied authority of the deck and its users. Historians such as Michael Dummett have described the Tarot pack as "the subject of the most successful propaganda campaign ever launched [...] An entire false history and false interpretation of the Tarot pack was concocted by the occultists and it is all but universally believed."

The earliest evidence of a tarot deck used for cartomancy comes from an anonymous manuscript from around 1750 which documents rudimentary divinatory meanings for the cards of the Tarocco Bolognese. The popularization of esoteric tarot started with Antoine Court and Jean-Baptiste Alliette (Etteilla) in Paris during the 1780s, using the Tarot of Marseilles. French tarot players abandoned the Marseilles tarot in favor of the Tarot Nouveau around 1900, with the result that the Marseilles pattern is now used mostly by cartomancers.

Etteilla was the first to produce a bespoke tarot deck specifically designed for occult purposes around 1789. In keeping with the unsubstantiated belief that such cards were derived from the Book of Thoth, Etteilla's tarot contained themes related to ancient Egypt.

In the occult tradition, tarot cards are referred to as "arcana", with the Fool and 21 trumps being termed the Major Arcana and the suit cards the Minor Arcana, terms not used by players of tarot card games.

The 78-card tarot deck used by esotericists has two distinct parts:

- The Major Arcana (greater secrets) consists of 22 cards without suits. Their names and numbers vary, but in a typical scheme, the names are:
  - The Fool, The Magician, The High Priestess, The Empress, The Emperor, The Hierophant, The Lovers, The Chariot, Strength, The Hermit, Wheel of Fortune, Justice, The Hanged Man, Death, Temperance, The Devil, The Tower, The Star, The Moon, The Sun, Judgement, and The World. Cards from The Magician to The World are numbered in Roman numerals from I to XXI, while The Fool is the only unnumbered card, sometimes placed at the beginning of the deck as 0, or at the end as XXII.
- The Minor Arcana (lesser secrets) consists of 56 cards, divided into four suits of 14 cards each;
  - Ten numbered cards and four court cards. The court cards are the King, Queen, Knight and Page/Jack, in each of the four tarot suits. The traditional Italian tarot suits are swords, batons, coins and cups; however, in modern occult tarot decks, the suit of batons is often called wands, rods or staves; the suit of coins is often called pentacles or disks and the suit of cups is often referred to as goblets.

The terms "Major Arcana" and "Minor Arcana" were first used by Jean-Baptiste Pitois (also known as Paul Christian), but are not used in relation to tarot card games. Some decks exist primarily as artwork, and such art decks sometimes contain only the 22 Major Arcana.

The three most common decks used in esoteric tarot are the Tarot of Marseilles (a playing card pack), the Rider–Waite Tarot, and the Thoth Tarot.

Aleister Crowley, who devised the Thoth deck along with Lady Frieda Harris, stated of the tarot: "The origin of this pack of cards is very obscure. Some authorities seek to put it back as far as the ancient Egyptian Mysteries; others try to bring it forward as late as the fifteenth or even the sixteenth century ... [but] The only theory of ultimate interest about the tarot is that it is an admirable symbolic picture of the Universe, based on the data of the Holy Qabalah."
