= Tarot de Besançon =

Type of Tarot playing card deck

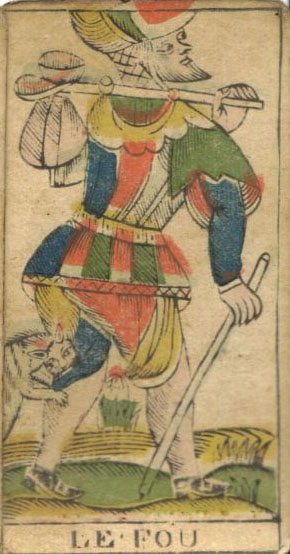
The Fool in the Besançon pack by Renault (c. 1820)

The Tarot de Besançon, also called the Besançon Tarot, describes an historical type of Tarot pack used for playing card games that was made in south Germany, France and Switzerland, including the town of Besançon.

== History ==
The Tarot de Besançon was derived from the older form of the Marseille type, now known as ‘Type-I Tarot de Marseille’, compared with which it portrays characteristic differences, notably that the Popess (trump II) and the Pope (trump V) are replaced by, respectively, Juno (Note: The queen of coins in the medieval Boiardo–Viti tarot, also found in da Tortona's deck.) and Jupiter. (Note: Bacchus occupies the same location in Belgian Tarot. Both Tarocco Siciliano and da Tortona's deck feature Jupiter as their highest trump, while the medieval Sola Busca tarot has his Greek equivalent, Zeus, seated on a chariot. Boiardo–Viti has him among its face cards, featuring his eagle on the fourth-highest position.) The earliest cards of this pattern came from Strasbourg in the early 18th century. During the mid-18th century other sources of manufacture included Colmar, Konstanz, Ulm and Munich, but the majority were manufactured in Alsace. The packs take their name from the eastern French town of Besançon, to which the cardmakers moved their production in the early 19th century, before being superseded in the late 18th century by French-suited tarot packs. The Swiss Tarot pattern, which emerged in Diessenhofen around 1860, was derived from the Tarot de Besançon.

== Description ==
Typical of card packs of the Besançon type is that the cards traditionally depicting the Papess and the Pope were redesigned to portray the Roman gods, Juno and Jupiter. It is assumed that this renaming took place in order to avoid upsetting religious sensitivities in an area of distribution marked by confessional contrasts.

Other features of the Besançon type compared with the Marseille Tarot are:

- Cupid is aiming at the eyes of the lovers.
- The face of the Moon appears head on and not in profile.
- The world is not depicted dancing, but standing in contrapost.

=== Suits ===
Suits of the Tarot de Besançon
Suit				
(United Kingdom)	Swords	Cups	Coins	Batons
(France)	Épées	Coupes	Deniers	Bâtons
Besançon	l'Épée	Coupes	Deniers	Baatons

Tarot of Besançon card deck (1890)
	1	2	3	4	5	6	7	8	9	10	Jack (Note: In decks produced during the French First Republic, some royal or religious trumps and face cards were given secular republican names; thus, queens and jacks were labelled Liberty and Equality, respectively; kings, genii; The Emperor and The Empress, grandfather and grandmother; and The Hermit, the poor.)	Knight	Queen	King
Coins														
Cups														
Swords														
Clubs														

=== Trumps ===
The Besançon Tarot includes the Swiss Tarot, which forms its own sub-type (see details in that article), and the Tarot d’Épinal, which also has specific variations in design. It was manufactured around 1830 or 1850 by the cardmaker, Pellerin, in Épinal, the wood engraving comes from François Georgin (1801–1863). Among the features are an additional card with the title, Consultant, which was clearly used as a Significator, which is why it may be assumed that the cards were also used for divinatory purposes and not, like other packs of this type at that time, used exclusively for playing cards.

The pictures below, showing the 22 trump cards, come from a pack with coloured wood carvings produced by Renault from Besançon around 1820–1830. The pack is based on a c. 1800 design by Jean Jerger, also from Besançon.

Lequart Paris 1890	Renault Besançon 1830	Number. Label.	Lequart Paris 1890	Renault Besançon 1830	Number. Label.
		(unnumbered) Le Fou (Le Mat) The Fool			I. Le Bateleur The Juggler
Reminiscent of a pair (Note: The tarot deck is precisely one and a half times the size of the standard 52-card deck, its additional twenty-six cards, namely four queens and twenty-two trumps, forming the exact equivalent of two extra card suits, (Note: Decks with five and six suits, respectively, were already attested as early as John of Rheinfelden's late 14th century treatise.) hence the aforementioned doubling, within this initial (sub)section.) (Note: The trumps of the contemporary Boiardo–Viti tarot consist of ten consecutive pairs of men and women, each embodying a vice and a virtue, respectively.) of jacks. (Note: The page of batons, for the former, and those of coins or spades, for the latter.)
		II. Junon Juno			III. L'Impératris (L'Impératrice) The Empress
Reminiscent of a pair of queens. (Note: In the contemporary Sola Busca tarot, all court cards (save for jacks) are explicitly labelled with additional meanings, taken from classical literature.)
		IIII. L'Empereur The Emperor			V. Jupiter
Reminiscent of a pair of kings.
		VI. (Note: One of the three theological virtues: love (VI), faith (IX) and hope, the latter being usually conflated.) (Note: The human fate (X) or lifespan, encompassing marriage (VI), old age (IX) and death (XIII), wedlock (VI) and monasticism (IX) being often contrasted.) (Note: Imagery reminiscent of astrological signs, as found, for instance, in this 16th century German woodcut: Sagittarius (VI), Libra (VIII), Leo (XI), Aquarius (XIV, XVII), Virgo (XIV, XVII, XXI), Cancer (XVIII), Gemini (XIX). The Minchiate explicitly depict all twelve constellations of the zodiac.) L'Amoure(u)x The Lovers			VII. Le Charior (Le Chariot) The; Chariot(eer)
Reminiscent of an archer, (Note: The contemporary Visconti-Sforza Tarot depicts death with a bow, instead of a scythe, while the earlier Boiardo–Viti deck contains a suit of arrows. An atypical 15th century jack of batons, hosted at the Guildhall Library, is portrayed as an archer aiming at a heron (see also Ambraser Hofjagdspiel).) like those found in the William Tell pack. (Note: First and last row, third from the left.)			Reminiscent of a knight.		
		VIII. (Note: One of the four cardinal virtues, from justice (VIII) to temperance (XIV), the wisdom of old age (IX) complementing the strength of youth (XI).) La Justice The Justice			VIIII. (Note: Hermits voluntarily renounce ephemeral distractions (0–I), carnal pleasures (VI), and worldly ranks or titles (II–V, VII–VIII).) Le Capucin (L'Hermite) The Monk (The Hermit)
Reminiscent of a queen of swords.			Reminiscent of Diogenes. (Note: The Boiardo–Viti and Sola Busca tarots feature exclusively mythical and historical figures of classical antiquity for their trumps and face cards.)		
		X. (Note: Hanging (XII) and being drawn on the breaking wheel (X) constitute medieval forms of torture, execution and capital punishment, oftentimes unto death (XIII).) La Roux (La Roue) de Fortune The Wheel of Fortune			XI. La Force The Strength
Fate, consisting of rise or ascent, climax or apogee, and downfall or descent.			See lions in heraldry, Nemean lion, (Note: The contemporary da Tortona deck has Hercules wearing its skin.); Samson's riddle, and 1 Samuel 17.		
		XII. Le Pendu The; Hanged Man			XIII. (Note: Medieval Christianity saw death (XIII) as the consequence of original sin, itself the result of temptation by the devil (XV), the former being undone by the resurrection unto eternal life, and the latter being condemned at the last judgement, hence the imagery and title of the XX^{th} trump (1 Thessalonians 4:16). In the surviving Visconti-Sforza decks, all intervening trumps between Death and Judgment are either wholly absent from, or form later additions to the original set.) (La Mort) The Death (unlabelled)
Reminiscent of Judas, (Note: The Sola Busca tarot includes two biblical characters in its trump suit. Before 1613, French playing cards featured Judas Maccabeus as the jack of clubs, the gibbet's supporting pillars being reminiscent of batons, and the young man of a knave. In the contemporary Visconti-Sforza Tarot, Strength, occupying the previous position, also resembles a page of wands.) who hung himself, after betraying Jesus. (Note: Labelled The Traitor, in Italian tarots.)			Depicted as the grim reaper and occupying the same position in all tarots.		
		XIIII. Tenpérance (Tempérance) Temperance			XV. (Note: The cosmological (sub)section, depicting the various vertical layers of the world (XXI), listed in ascending order, from hell (XV) to heaven (XX).) Le Diable The Devil
Reminiscent of a maid of cups, like those found in Visconti-Sforza, (Note: The complete Cary-Yale set.) the Minchiate, and Portuguese-suited playing cards.			The underworld or netherworld, envisioned as a subterranean realm.		
		XVI. La Maison; Dieu The House of God			XVII. Le Toille (L'Étoile) The Star
A tower, (Note: In other tarots (Belgium, Viéville), a tree.) rising towards the sky, and a lightning strike, descending from heaven.			Shares similar imagery with Temperance (XIV), itself reminiscent of a maid of cups.		
		XVIII. La Lune The Moon			XVIIII. Le Soleil The Sun
Night and day. The main luminaries of the celestial sphere.
		XX. Le; Juegmant (Jugement) The; Judgement			XXI. Le Monde The World
The angelic heaven, above the firmament.			The world to come after the last judgement (XX).		

== Manufacturers ==
Known manufacturers of card packs of this type include:

- Jean-Baptiste Benois
- Suzanne Bernardin
- J. Blanche, Besançon
- J. H. Blanck et Tschann
- Louis Carey, Strasbourg
- Andreas Benedict Göbl
- Arnoult Grimaud
- François Héri
- Jean Jerger, Besançon
- A. Kirchner, Besançon
- Joseph Krebs, Freiburg
- L. de Laboisse, Strasbourg
- Pierre Lachapele
- Nicolas François Laudier, Strasbourg
- Jean Pierre Laurent
- Arnoult Lequart
- Guillaume Mann, Colmar
- Johann Pelagius Mayer, Constance
- Renault, Besançon
- Bernhard Schaer, Mumlisweil
- Jean Tissot
- Wolfgang Weber
- Johannes Muller, Schaffhousen
- Josef Rauch Miller, Salzburg

== Literature ==
- Dummett, Sir Michael (1980). The Game of Tarot: From Ferrara to Salt Lake City. London: Duckworth.
- Graf, Eckhard (1991). Lexikon des Tarot sowie der Orakel- und Selbsterfahrungsspiele. Nagelschmid, Stuttgart 1991, ISBN 3-927913-03-0.
- Mann, Sylvia (1990). All Cards on the Table, Jonas Verlag/Deutsches Spielkarten-Museum, Leinfelden-Echterdingen
- Rodik, Belinda (2008) Tarot-Lexikon. Grundbegriffe und Schlüsselworte zu Symbolik und Deutung. Schirmer, Darmstadt 2008, ISBN 978-3-89767-612-1, pp 323–346.
