= Trionfi (cards) =

15th and 16th-century Italian playing card sets

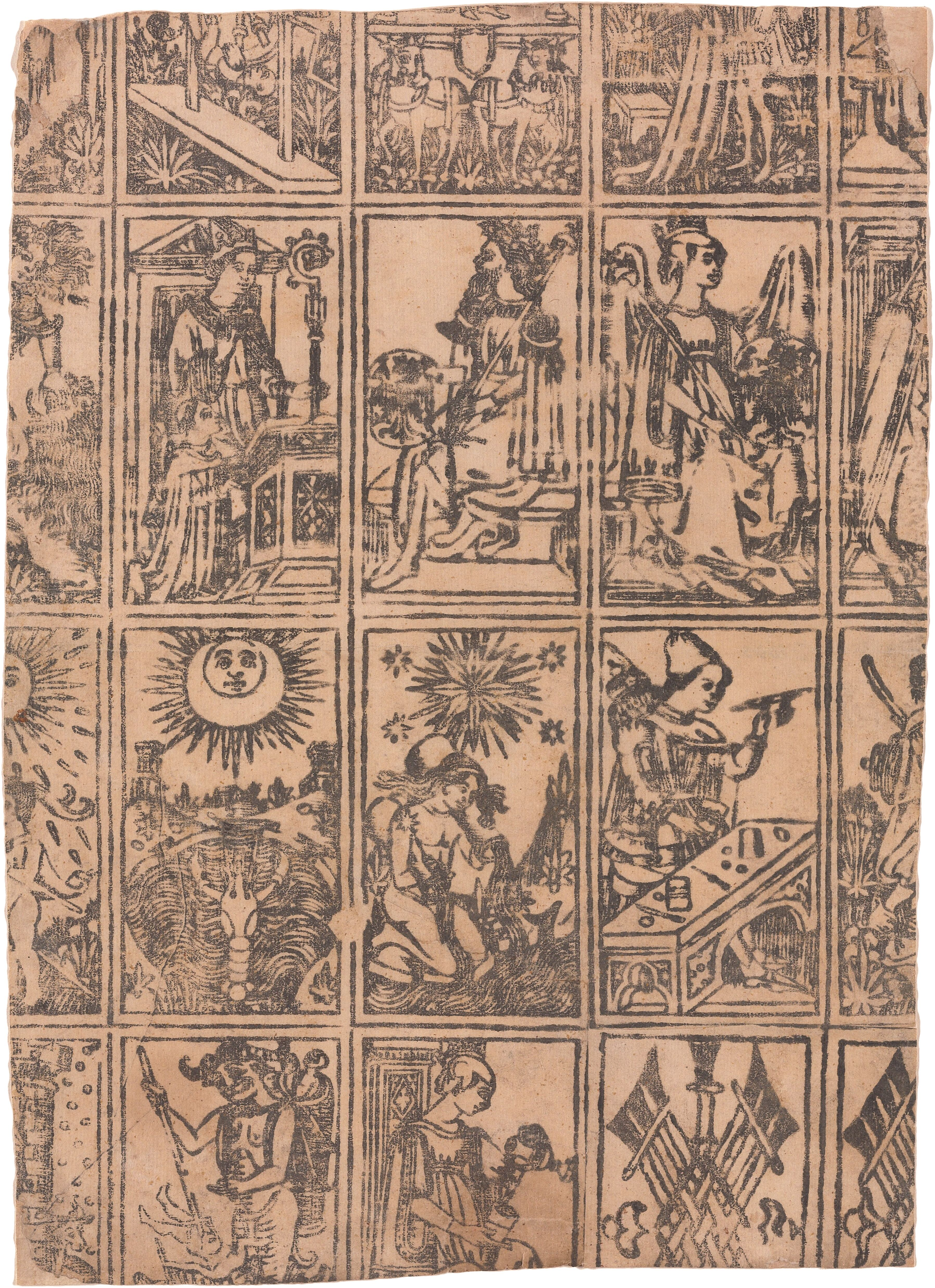
Cary sheet, Milan c. 1500.

Trionfi (Italian: [triˈoɱfi], 'triumphs') are 15th and 16th-century Italian playing card sets, all trumps rather than numbers, with allegorical content related to those used in tarocchi games. The general English expression trump card and the German trumpfen have developed from the Italian trionfi. Most cards feature the personification of a place or abstraction.

== History ==
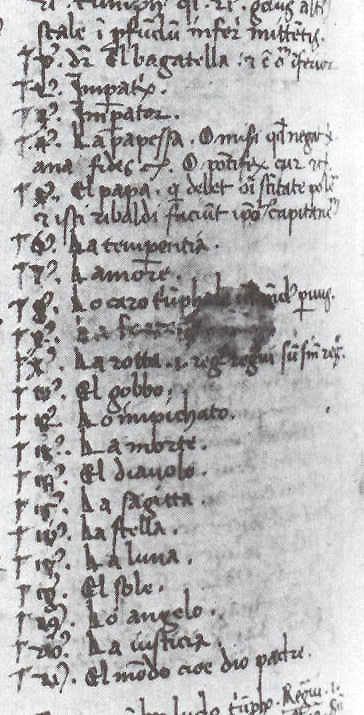
Earliest known list of trumps (Venice, c.1480–1500)

Many of the motifs found in trionfi also appear in trionfo, theatrical processions that were popular in the Italian Renaissance. The Palazzo Schifanoia in Ferrara, once owned by the ducal House of Este, contains many murals depicting these floats. Petrarch wrote a poem called I Trionfi which may have served as inspiration.

The earliest known use of the name trionfi in relation to cards can be dated to 16 September 1440 in the records of a Florentine notary, Giusto Giusti. He recorded a transaction where he transferred two expensive personalized decks to Sigismondo Pandolfo Malatesta.

=== Da Tortona's deck ===
In a letter dated 11 November 1449, Jacopo Antonio Marcello used the expression triumphorum genus for a deck produced sometime between 1418 and 1425, commissioned by the duke of Milan, Filippo Maria Visconti, painted by Michelino da Besozzo, and described in an accompanying text by Martiano da Tortona, the namesake of the city's patron saint, Marcian of Tortona, his account being the second-earliest description of the configuration of a pack of cards in Europe, after John of Rheinfelden's late 14th century treatise attesting to the existence of a four-color deck.

While the deck itself is lost, Marcello provided a copy of da Tortona's description, offering details about the deck, along with a cursory explanation of how to play it. It likely had a total of 60 cards (four kings, forty pip cards and sixteen trumps), its forty-four plain-suited cards using birds for suit signs (Note: Early hunting decks, like the contemporary Stuttgart pack and Ambraser Hofjagdspiel, also feature suits of fowls, such as ducks, falcons and herons, respectively.) ("of virtues, the eagle; of riches, the phoenix; of continence, the turtledove; of pleasure, the dove", see animal tarot), and its trumps portraying sixteen Roman or Greek gods (in descending order: the Twelve Olympians, with Bacchus replacing Vulcan instead of Vesta, the latter being both fire gods; followed by Hercules, Aeolus, Daphne, and Cupid).

In two of the suits (phoenices and doves), the pip cards are in reverse order, as in many of the oldest card games, a ranking also found in Tarot, Triomphe, Ombre, Maw, Unsun Karuta, Madiao, Khanhoo, Tổ tôm, and Ganjifa. The suits do not have any "right over another," each trump being associated with a suit, in alternating descending order of eagle, phoenix, turtledove, and dove, making it the only tarot to exhibit such a feature.

Marziano da Tortona's sixteen (Note: The minor arcanas of the three contemporary Visconti-Sforza tarots consist of four sixteen-card suits each; furthermore, in all extant decks, the six trumps between Death and Judgement (when arranged in Marseilles order), are either wholly absent from, or form later additions to the original sets, none of its surviving major arcanas containing more than sixteen first edition cards each, tentatively suggesting an initial five-suited eighty-card pack, decks with five and six suits, respectively, having already been attested as early as John of Rheinfelden's late 14th century treatise.) deified heroes
No.	Eagles (Note: The trumps of the contemporary Boiardo–Viti tarot also feature animals.)	No.	Phoenixes	No.	Turtledoves	No.	Doves
1	Jove (Note: The highest trump, both here and in Tarocco Siciliano. The contemporary Boiardo–Viti tarot has his eagle on the fourth-highest position. Depicted here as The Emperor (IV), and occupying the next location (V) in Swiss Tarot and Tarot de Besançon. Featured as the king of arrows in the aforementioned Boiardo–Viti pack. Also found in the medieval Sola Busca deck.) (Note: Portrayed as a royal couple, their trumps occupying consecutive places. The contemporary Boiardo–Viti pack features a king and a queen at the same location, as does Tarocco Siciliano on the next position (II and III), while all other non-Belgian tarots contain two such pairs.)	2	Juno (Note: Found on the same position in Swiss Tarot and Tarot de Besançon. Depicted here as The Empress, occupying the same or next location in all tarots, and featured as the queen of coins in the contemporary Boiardo–Viti pack. Always portrayed with a peacock by her side.)	3	Pallas (Note: The queen of wands in the contemporary Sola Busca tarot, and the queen of spades in French-suited playing cards.)	4	Venus (Note: The queen of arrows in the contemporary Boiardo–Viti pack, featuring doves there as well. The fourth-highest trump here, explicitly compared to the morning star, being depicted half-nude and disheveled. The Star, ranking fifth or sixth (from the top) in all tarots, employs similar imagery in most non-Italian decks, save for Belgium and Viéville.)
5	Apollo (Note: God of The Sun.)	6	Neptune (Note: The contemporary Boiardo–Viti tarot also features a phoenix on the same position.)	7	Diana (Note: Goddess of The Moon, explicitly mentioned in the contemporary Boiardo–Viti tarot, on a trump card depicting Actaeon, whose story is also referenced here, in the accompanying chapter of da Tortona's treatise.)	8	Bacchus (Note: Also found in Belgian Tarot and the contemporary Sola Busca deck. The equivalent of Dionysus, whose namesake, Dionysius I of Syracuse, is featured as the king of whips in the contemporary Boiardo–Viti pack.)
9	Mercury	10	Mars (Note: Depicted as the knight of swords. Justice, employing similar imagery, occupies a nearby position (VII or VIII) in all other tarots.)	11	Vesta	12	Ceres
13	Hercules (Note: Preceded by the Twelve Olympians, whose number coincides with that of his labours. Described and depicted as the quintessential strongman, wearing the skin of the Nemean lion, wildlife portrayed on non-Italian renditions of Strength. The contemporary Boiardo–Viti tarot features a trump symbolizing his death, on the same position.)	14	Aeolus	15	Daphne	16	Cupid (Note: The Lovers, employing similar imagery, ranks sixteenth (from the top) in all other decks, save for Tarocco Siciliano, when excluding The Fool (highest in Belgium) and the twenty additional Minchiate trumps. Judgement, labelled The Angel in Italian versions of the game, employs similar imagery, occupying one of the last three positions in all tarots.)

=== Sforza's deck ===
Two 70-card (Note: The minor arcana consists of four fourteen-card suits, the only other tarot game known to have had a multiple of fourteen as its total number of cards, prior to eventually dropping the Popess, being the Florentine Minchiate.) decks dated to June 1457, relating to Galeazzo Maria Sforza's visit at Ferrara the following month, the modern Tarot deck typically consisting of 78 cards altogether.

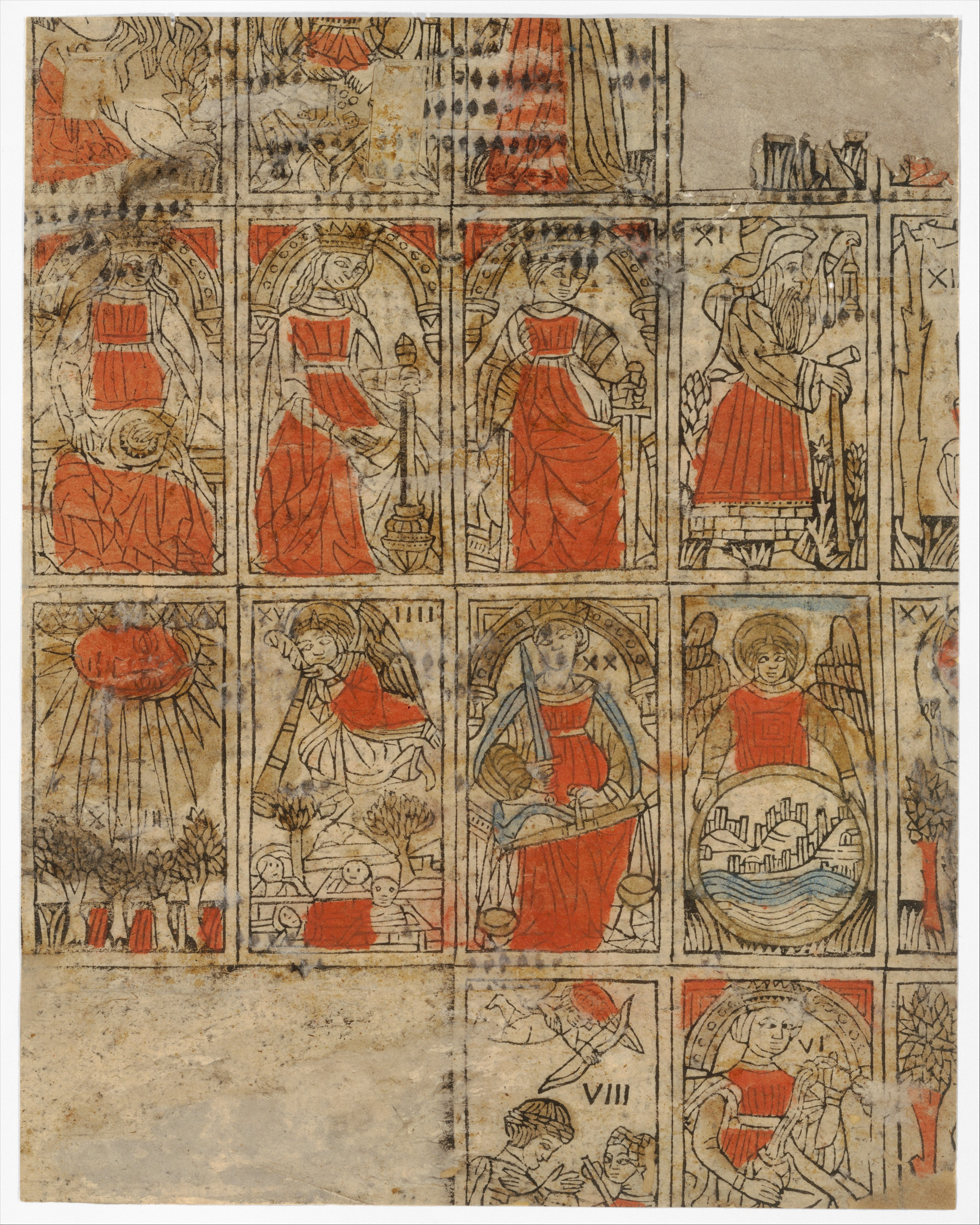
Met sheet, Ferrara c. 1500.

=== Boiardo's deck ===
The first mention of a 78-card deck (Note: Along with two extra cards, containing the poem's prologue and epilogue, amounting to a total of eighty.) was in a poem by Matteo Maria Boiardo of Ferrara, written between 1461–1494. While the deck was structured like modern tarots, its motifs and suits signs were totally different, using classical figures for its trumps and face cards. Pier Antonio Viti of Urbino (c. 1470–1500), brother of Timoteo Viti, provided a commentary on Boiardo's poem, as well as rules of play. He likely commissioned the production of these decks, of which two incomplete packs have survived, both the rules and the deck likely constituting conscious departures from common trionfi decks.

=== Dummett's classification ===
The order of the trumps varied by region, perhaps as early as the 1440s. Michael Dummett placed them into three categories. In Bologna and Florence, the highest trump is the Angel, followed by the World. This group spread mainly southward through the Papal States, the Kingdom of Naples, and finally down to the Kingdom of Sicily but was also known in the Savoyard states. In Ferrara, the World was the highest, followed by Justice and the Angel. This group spread mainly to the northeast to Venice and Trento, where it was only a passing fad, becoming extinct by the end of the 16th century. In Milan, the World was the highest, followed by the Angel. This spread to Switzerland and France during the Italian Wars, becoming famous as the Tarot of Marseilles.

=== Tarocchi ===
The earliest known appearance of the word Tarocho as the new name for the game is in Brescia around 1502. Tarochi was used in June 1505 in Ferrara. In December 1505, Taraux decks are mentioned as being produced in the papal enclave of Avignon in France. Around this time, the word trionfi seems to modify its character in a playing card context; it appears as a game of its own (Rabelais knows a Tarau and a Triumphe game) and seems no longer connected to the specific allegorical cards. This is most likely due to the popularity of Trionfa, which usurped the old name. The word taroch was used as a synonym for foolishness in the same period.

== Surviving decks ==
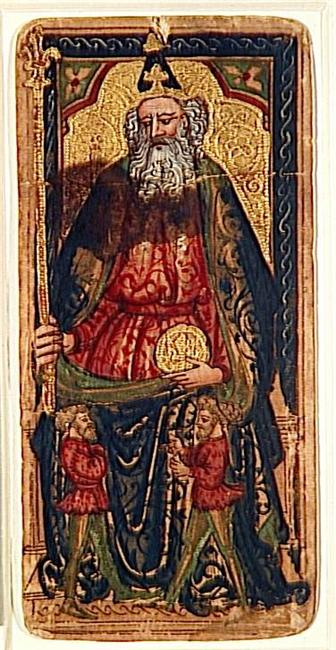
The Emperor, the only surviving trump from the Rothschild-Bassano deck. He carries a florin while holding a sceptre surmounted by the fleur-de-lis, both symbols of Florence.

Expensive hand-painted, and usually gilded, decks custom-made for powerful clients have been preserved in greater numbers than mass-produced decks. More cards from the 15th and early 16th centuries have survived than those from the late 16th or 17th century.

=== Handmade ===
There are around 15 Visconti-Sforza tarot decks made for the rulers of Milan. These are the best preserved:

- The Cary-Yale deck is estimated to have been produced for the marriage of Bianca Maria Visconti and Francesco Sforza in October 1441
- The Pierpont-Morgan-Bergamo deck (estimated to be produced 1452) possibly relates to a trionfo in Milan, August 1453
- The Brera-Brambilla deck made for Francesco Sforza

The following decks were made in Florence:

- The Castello Ursino deck made for Alessandro Sforza
- The de Gaignières deck by the same artist as the one above, mistakenly attributed to Charles VI of France
- The Rothschild-Bassano deck, half of the pack survive but only one trump remains
- The Ercole d'Este deck in the Cary Collection

=== Uncut sheets ===
- The Cary sheet (c.1500) along with the six Novati cards (c.1600) found in Sforza Castle, Milanese ancestor to the Tarot of Marseilles
- The Budapest-Met sheets, examples of Ferrarese tarocchi (c.1500) which died out around 1600
- The Rothschild-Beaux Arts sheets, the earliest known Tarocco Bolognese cards (late 15th/early 16th century)
- The Rosenwald sheets, early Florentine tarots (late 15th century) before their development into Minchiate
- Various Portuguese-suited sheets and cards from the Papal States and the Kingdom of Naples; a relative of the Sicilian tarot

=== Decks with classical motifs ===
- At least two incomplete decks inspired by Boiardo's poem
- The copper-engraved Sola Busca tarot, late 15th century, only deck with all 78 cards intact
- The Leber deck held in the Municipal Library of Rouen, early 16th century
- The Cicognara deck is lost but a few cards were copied, possibly created by the same person who made the Leber deck

== See also ==
- Hofämterspiel
- Karnöffel
- Mantegna Tarocchi
- Tarot card games
- Trick-taking game
- Triomphe
- Trump (card games)
