= Belgian Tarot =

Pattern of Tarot playing cards

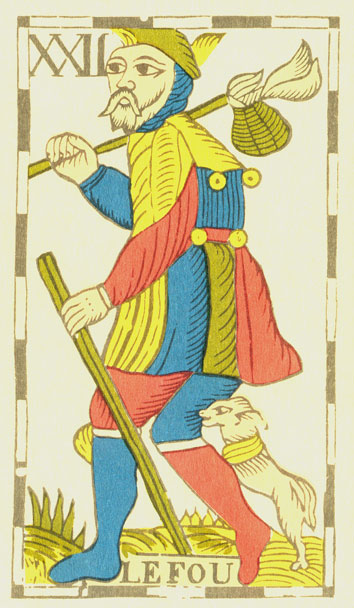
Le Fou (The Fool) from the Belgian Tarot

The Belgian Tarot is a name given to standard pattern of Tarot playing cards that were initially produced in the Prince-Bishopric of Liège, then Rouen, and later in the Austrian Netherlands from the late 17th to late 18th century. They are also called the "Rouen/Brussels pattern." Starting from the mid-18th century, the wrapping paper bore the inscription "Cartes de Suisses". However, there is no evidence that this type of Tarot cards was ever manufactured, sold, or used in Switzerland.

== History ==
=== Background ===
Tarot playing cards emerged in the early 15th century in northern Italy, the first documented packs being associated with Milan, Ferrara, Florence and Bologna when an additional set of trumps known as trionfi were added to a standard, Italian-suited pack with the four suits: Swords, Batons, Cups and Coins. The earliest surviving examples are the Visconti-Sforza Tarot packs painted in the mid-15th century for the Dukes of Milan.

Because the earliest tarot cards were hand-painted, they were probably only produced in small numbers. However, the advent of the printing press enabled the mass production of cards and their spread elsewhere. The expansion of tarot outside of Italy, first to France and Switzerland, occurred during the Italian Wars. The most prominent tarot deck version used in these two countries was the Tarot of Marseilles, of Milanese origin.

=== Emergence and spread of the Belgian Tarot ===
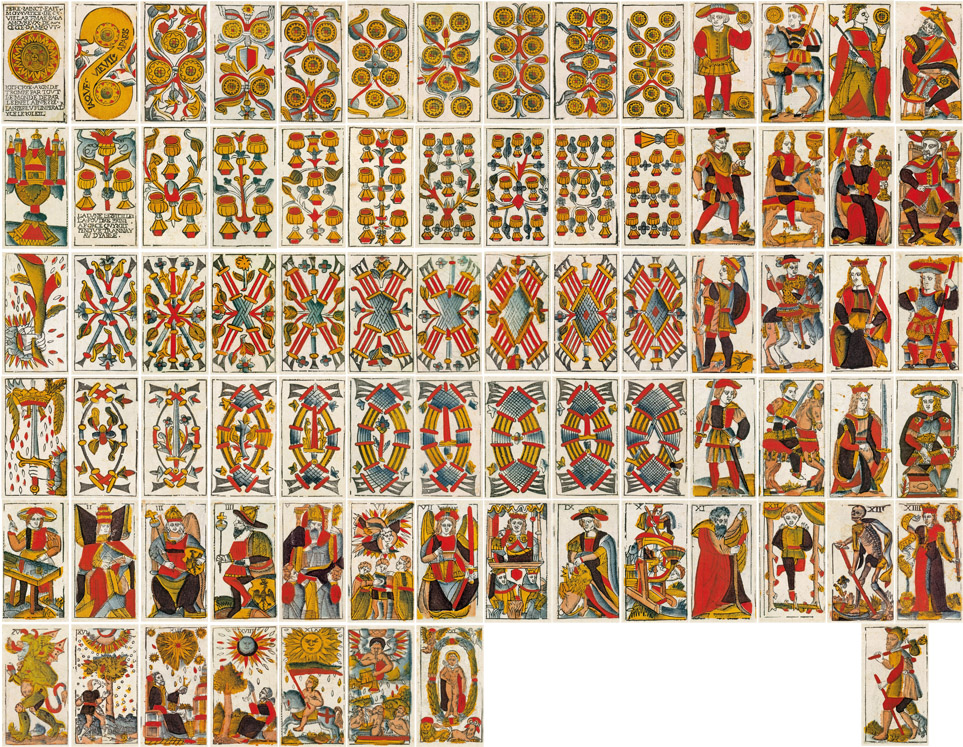
Viéville's tarot, circa 1650.

Although it is said that "in the late 16th century a heavy French tax on playing card manufacture drove many cardmakers to emigrate to Switzerland where they created a new design of tarot pack that became known as Cartes de Suisses," there is absolutely no evidence for such an emigration. In Switzerland, the manufacture of playing cards was dying and ceased completely in the early 17th century, and the Swiss had to import their playing cards from Épinal (then in the Duchy of Lorraine) and Lyon. The design of the so-called Cartes de Suisses cannot have been set up in Switzerland. On the contrary, these cards appear to have a strong Italian underlying design with a clear layer of French details added. They bear a strong connection to a pack produced by Jacques Viéville of Paris around 1650. The earliest cardmaker for this pattern was Gérard Bodet of Liège in 1693. Around 1723, Adam C. de Houtot of Rouen produced the earliest version that labelled the previously unnumbered Fool as XXII.

This pattern was adopted by cardmakers in the Austrian Netherlands perhaps as a result of the spread of a Swiss tarot card game, such as Troggu, to that part of the world during the 18th century. There were many Swiss mercenaries in the Dutch service garrisoned in the Austrian Netherlands. At that time this design became a standard pattern there in the 18th century, the name Cartes de Suisses being retained.

In 1849, for example, a pack of "Swiss Tarots, Cartes de Suisses" is advertised for sale in a catalogue. The description notes that it was made in Brussels by F. J. Vandenborre, cardmaker, and comprises 78 cards, "the Coat Cards are exceedingly curious, representing Bacchus, Love, Death, the Devil, Lightning, Sun, Moon, Stars, Day of Judgement, Fool, &c."

The name Flemish Tarot was given because the cards were thought to be made in the Flemish-speaking part of the Austrian Netherlands. However, this an error: the places were they were made – Brussels, Bouvignes, Liège, Dinant – were all out of Flanders.

== Cards ==
The Belgian Tarot pattern is different from the Tarot de Marseilles, its key distinguishing features being:

- Tarot II: The Popess is replaced by "L'Espagnol. Capitano Eracasse," a swaggering Spanish captain. (Note: Trumps II–IV are reminiscent of a jack, queen and king, respectively.)
- Tarot V: The Pope is replaced by Bacus, (Note: Also found in the medieval da Tortona and Sola Busca decks. The deuces of the William Tell pack employ similar imagery. Jupiter occupies the same position in Swiss Tarot and Tarot de Besançon.) the god of wine. (Note: The equivalent of Dionysus, whose namesake, Dionysius I of Syracuse, is featured as the king of whips in the medieval Boiardo–Viti pack.)
- Tarot XII: The inscription for the Hanged Man (Le Pendue) is spelt Lepen-du.
- Tarot XVI: The House of God (Maison Dieu) is replaced by "Lightning" (La Foudre).
- Tarot XXII: The Fool is, unusually, numbered, perhaps because it had recently been promoted to the top card (see Troggu).

The designs on many of the tarots are also different. For example, The Star depicts a seated astronomer instead of a kneeling woman. They clearly come from another Italian tradition.

The pictures below portray the 22 trump cards of the Belgian Tarot:

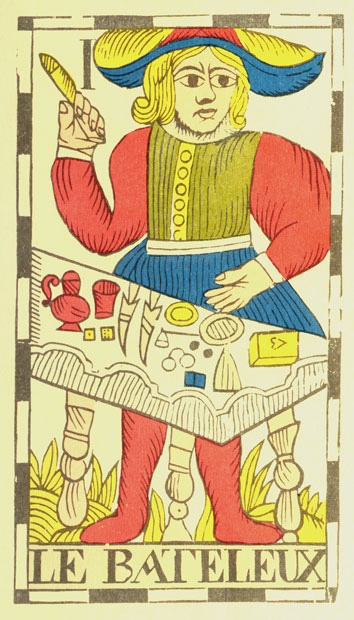
Le Bateleux

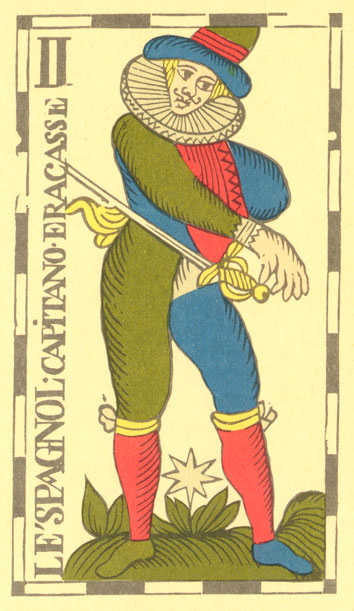
LE'spagno - Capitano Eracasse

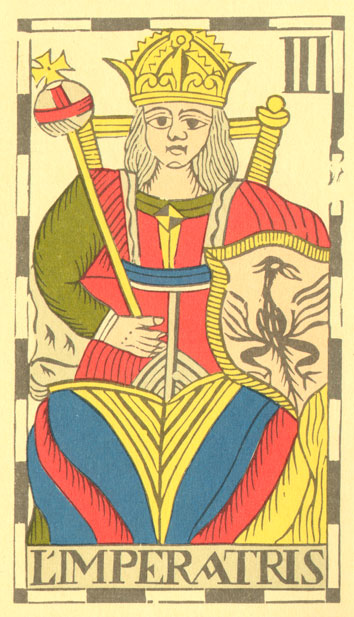
L'Imperatris

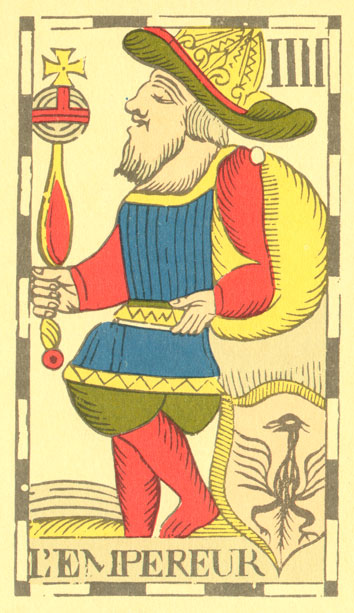
L'Empereur

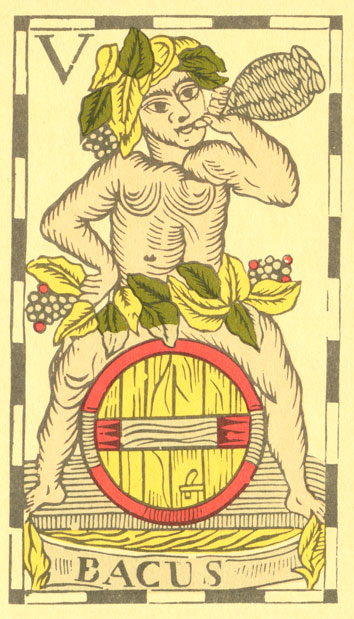
Bacus

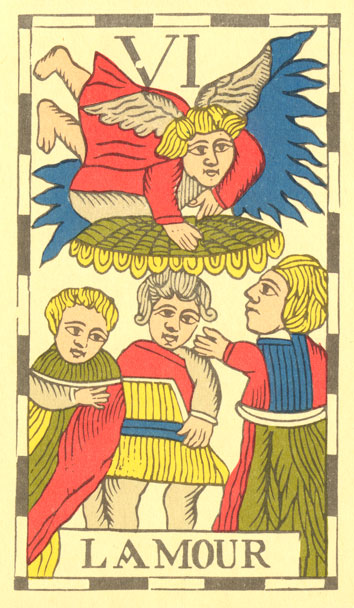
L'Amour

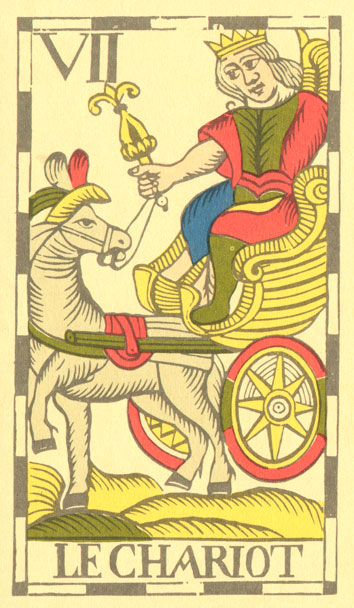
Le Chariot

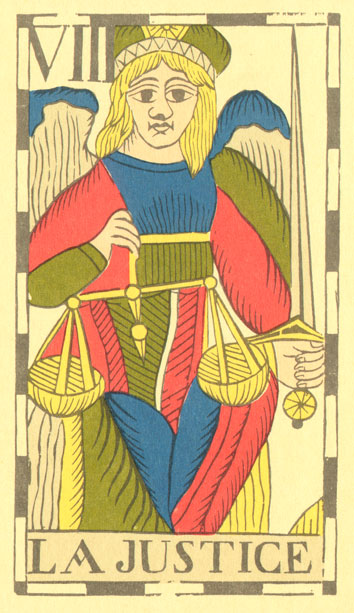
La Justice

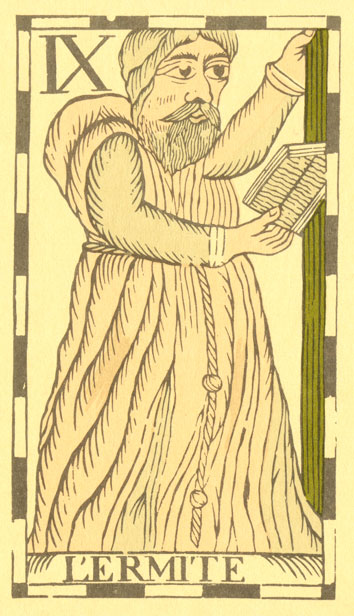
L'Ermite

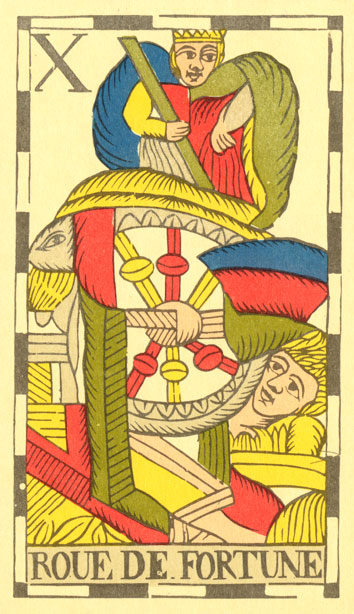
Roue de Fortune

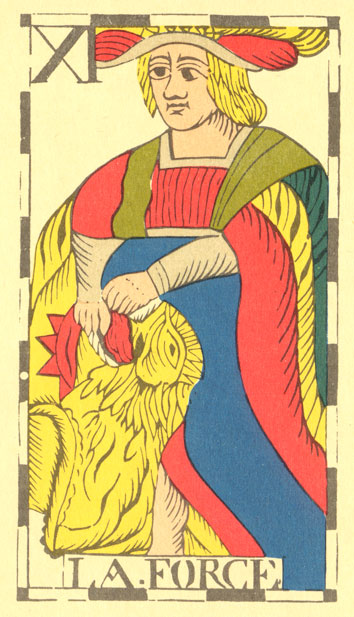
La Force

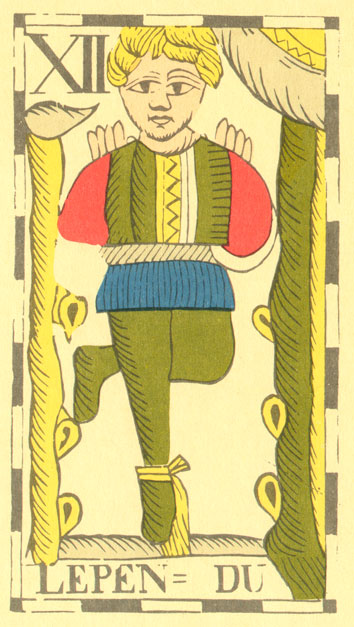
Lepen-Du

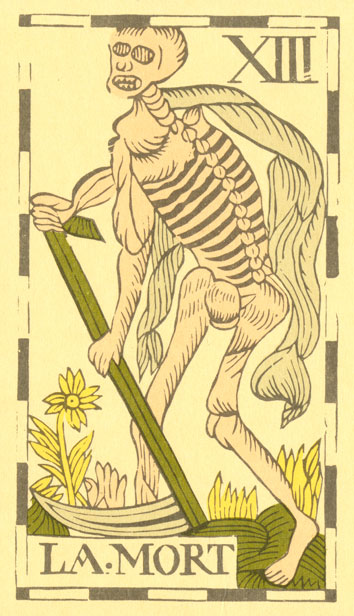
La Mort

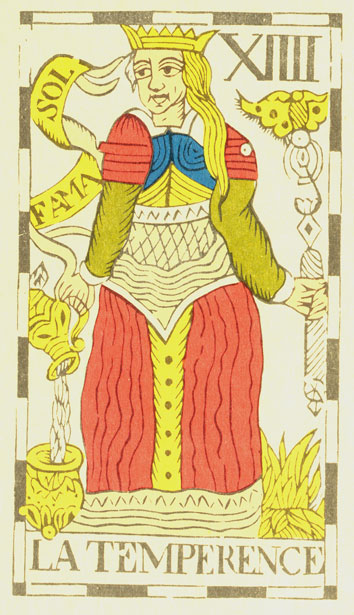
La Temperance

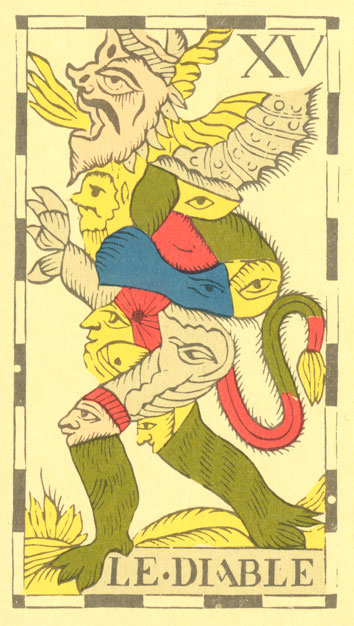
Le Diable

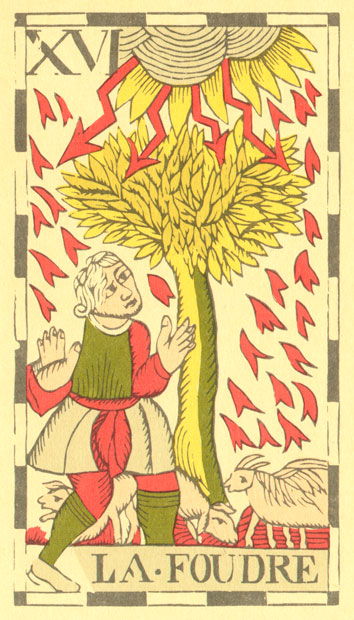
La Foudre

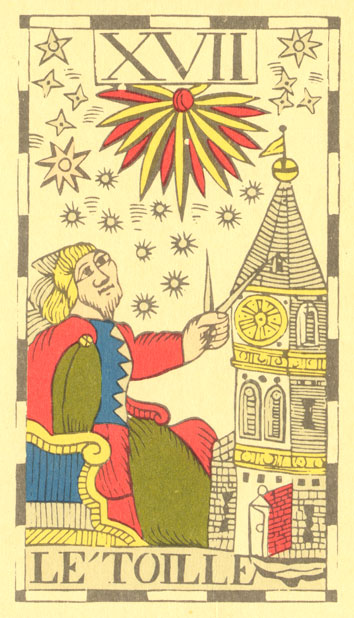
LE'toille

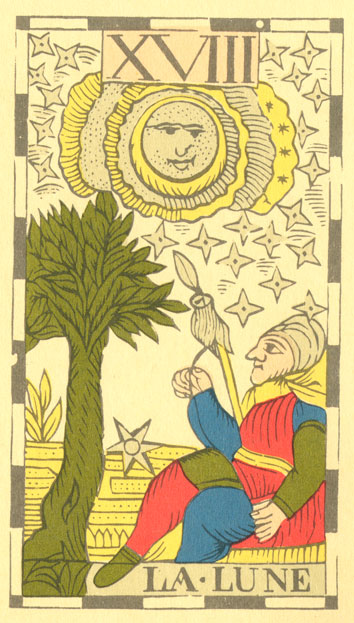
La Lune

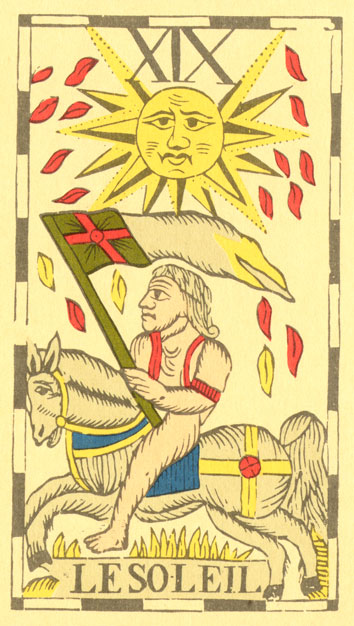
Le Soleil

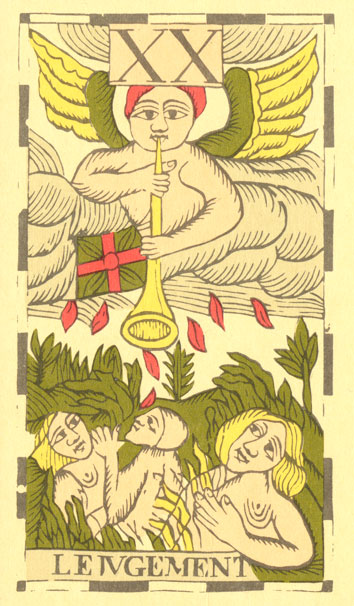
Le Jugement

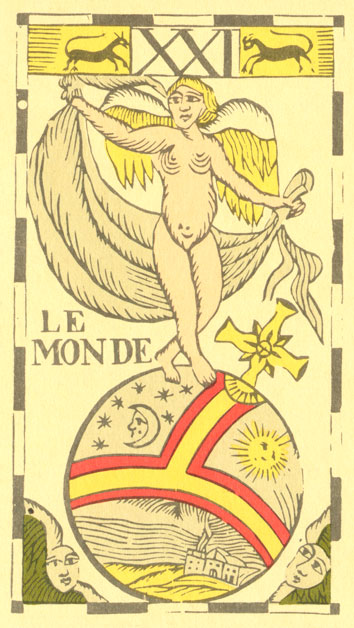
Le Monde

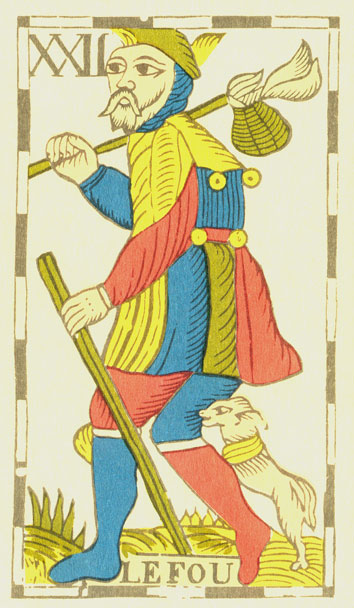
Le Fou

== Bibliography ==
- Depaulis, Thierry (1984). Tarot: Jeu et Magie. Paris: Bibliothèque Nationale. ISBN 2-7177-1699-8.
- Depaulis, Thierry; Decker, Ronald; Dummett, Michael (1996). A Wicked Pack of Cards: The Origins of the Occult Tarot. London: Duckworth Books. ISBN 978-0-312-16294-8.
- Dummett, Michael (1980). The Game of Tarot: From Ferrara to Salt Lake City. London: Duckworth Books. ISBN 978-0-7156-1014-5.
- Dummett, Michael; McLeod, John (2004). A History of Games Played with the Tarot Pack. Lewiston, New York; Queenston, Ontario; Lampeter, Wales: Edwin Mellen Press. ISBN 0-7734-6447-6. ISBN 0-7734-6449-2
- Kaplan, Stuart R. (1978). Encyclopedia of Tarot. Vol. 2. Stamford, Connecticut: U.S. Games Systems. ISBN 0-913866-36-9.
- Pratesi, Franco (2012). "In Search of Tarot Sources". The Playing-Card. 41 (2).
