= Swiss Tarot =

Swiss card games deck

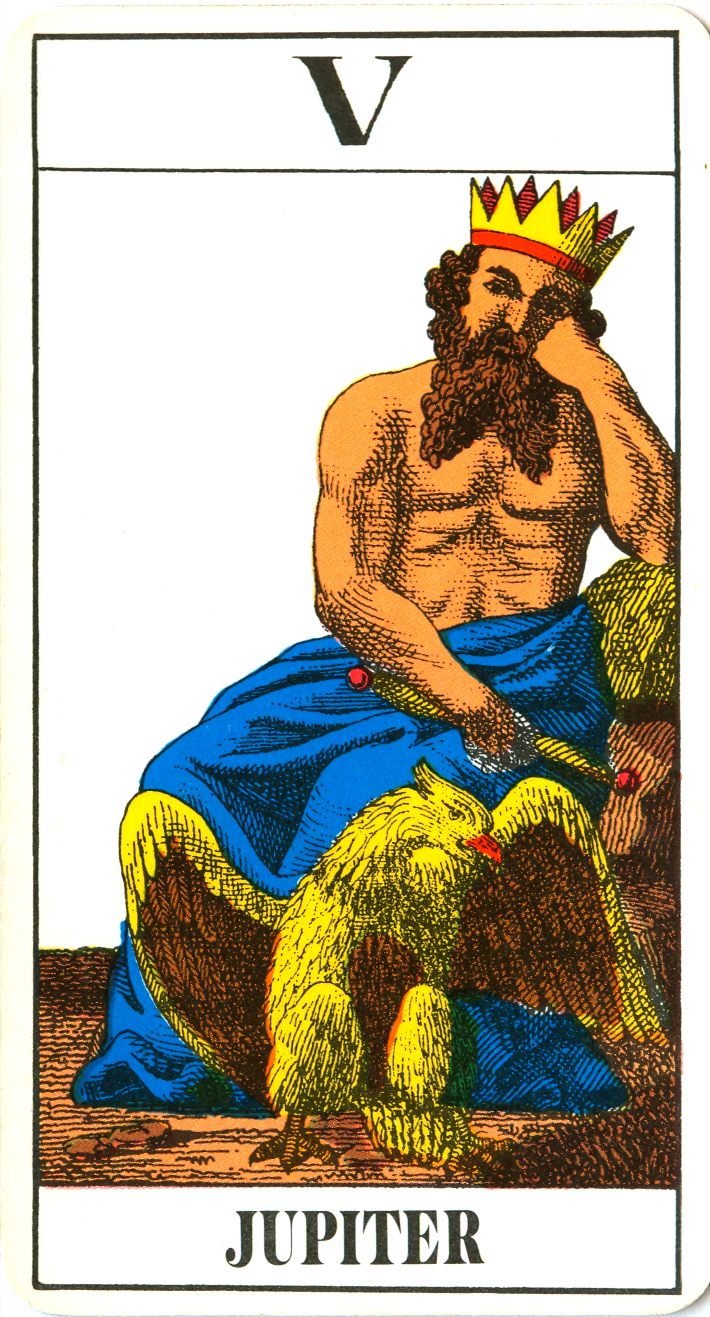
Jupiter, (Note: Bacchus occupies the same location in Belgian Tarot. Both Tarocco Siciliano and da Tortona's deck feature Jupiter as their highest trump, while the medieval Sola Busca tarot has his Greek equivalent, Zeus, seated on a chariot. Boiardo–Viti has him among its face cards, featuring his eagle on the fourth-highest position.) the fifth trump

The Swiss Tarot deck is a 78-card deck used for the tarot card games Troccas and Troggu. It is also sometimes called the JJ Tarot due to the replacement of the usual second and fifth trumps with cards depicting Juno (Note: The queen of coins in the medieval Boiardo–Viti tarot, also found in da Tortona's deck.) and Jupiter, or as 1JJ Tarot in reference to the catalog number of a common release of the deck by A.G. Müller. (Note: "Swiss Tarot" is the name recommended by the International Playing-Card Society.)

== History ==
The deck is derived from the Tarot de Besançon, which itself comes from the Tarot of Marseilles. It is an Italian suited pack which substitutes the figures of Juno and Jupiter in place of the Popess and Pope of the Tarot of Marseilles. The first version was produced between 1831 and 1838 in the card factory of Johann Georg Rauch. It was the first tarot pack made by the factory and was unexpectedly successful in the American market. The first version was manufactured, unaltered, by his successor, Johannes Müller in Diessenhofen until 1860.

In 1965 the Swiss card game firm, A.G. Müller, issued a reprint which is distinguished by its cleaner lines. The alternative name for the pack comes from this edition, the "1" simply being a number within the product line and "JJ" the replacement of 2 trumps by Juno and Jupiter.

== Cards ==
The face cards are not double headed and both the trumps and pip cards use additive Roman numeral indexing. The lack of modern features like vertically symmetrical face cards, corner indices, and Arabic numerals has made this deck unpopular for tarot players outside of their native communities. For example, the French-speaking Swiss (Romands) prefer using the Tarot Nouveau to play French tarot. It is still the official deck for Troccas tournaments.

Troggu players use the German version. Troccas players use the French-language version but refer to their cards with their Romansh (Rhæto-Romanic) nicknames. In 2016, A.G. Müller began printing of Sursilvan captioned packs for Troccas players on behalf of Radiotelevisiun Svizra Rumantscha. The names and designs of the cards are as follows:

=== Trump cards ===
Image	Number. Caption. (United Kingdom) (Germany) (France)	Additional Rhæto-Romanic names and their translation (Note: When available; same as the first two columns, otherwise.)	
	(unnumbered) The Fool; Der Narr; Le Mat il narr		I. The Magician; Der Magier; Le Bateleur (Note: The shell game player.) il bagat
	II. Junon; Junon; Junon la gaglina (Note: The chicken. (Note: See animal tarot.))	la biua	the chicken (Note: Baby talk.)
	III. The Empress; Die Herrscherin; L'Impératrice l'imperatura		IIII. The Emperor; Der Herrscher; L'Empereur igl imperatur
	V. Jupiter	il da Cuoz; il Diu fauls	the man from Cuoz (Note: A suburb of Disentis.); the false God
	VI. The Lovers; Die Liebenden; L'Amoureux ils inamura(i)	—	
	VII. The Chariot; Der Wagen; Le Chariot il carr (Note: The carriage.)	la Catrina en crotscha	Catherine in a chariot
	VIII. Justice; Gerechtigkeit; La Justice la giustia	la stadera	the scales
	VIIII. The Hermit; Der Eremit; L'Ermite il pader (Note: The monk.)		X. Wheel of Fortune; Rad des Schicksals; La Roue de Fortune la roda dalla fortuna
	XI. Strength; Kraft; La Force la forza	la ventira	fate
	XII. The Hanged Man; Der Gehängte; Le Pendu il pendiu		XIII. Death; Der Tod; La Mort la mort
	XIIII. Temperance; Die Mässigkeit; Tempérance igl aunghel (Note: The angel.)	la tempronza	temperance
	XV. The Devil; Der Teufel; Le Diable il giavel	il da cornas; il naucli; il bab dallas femnas	the horned one; the evil one; the father of women
	XVI. The Tower; Der Turm; La Maison de Dieu il tiaratriembel (Note: The earthquake.)	la casa da Diu; il cametg; la Cadi; la claustra barschada	the house of God; the lightning; the Church; the burning monastery
	XVII. The Star(s); Der Stern; L'Étoile las steilas	—	
	XVIII. The Moon; Der Mond; La Lune la glina		XVIIII. The Sun; Die Sonne; Le Soleil il sulegl
	XX. Judgment; Gericht; Le Jugement il truament (Note: The tribunal.)	la dertgira; ils bluts; la giuven– tetgna	judgement; the nudes; youth
	XXI. The World; Die Welt; Le Monde il mund	la vaca; la biala; la ferma; il miau; il min	the cow; (the) beauty (Note: Both an abstract noun (beauty) and a substantivized feminine adjective (the beautiful woman).); (the) beauty; the cat; the cat

=== Suit cards ===
Suit No.	Cups	Pentacles (Note: In English, the face cards are explicitly labelled pentacles despite not featuring any.)	Swords	Wands
Ace				
2				
3				
4				
5				
6				
7				
8				
9				
10				
Page				
Knight				
Queen				
King				
