= Troggu =

Card game

- A trick-taking game of the European Tarot card game family.
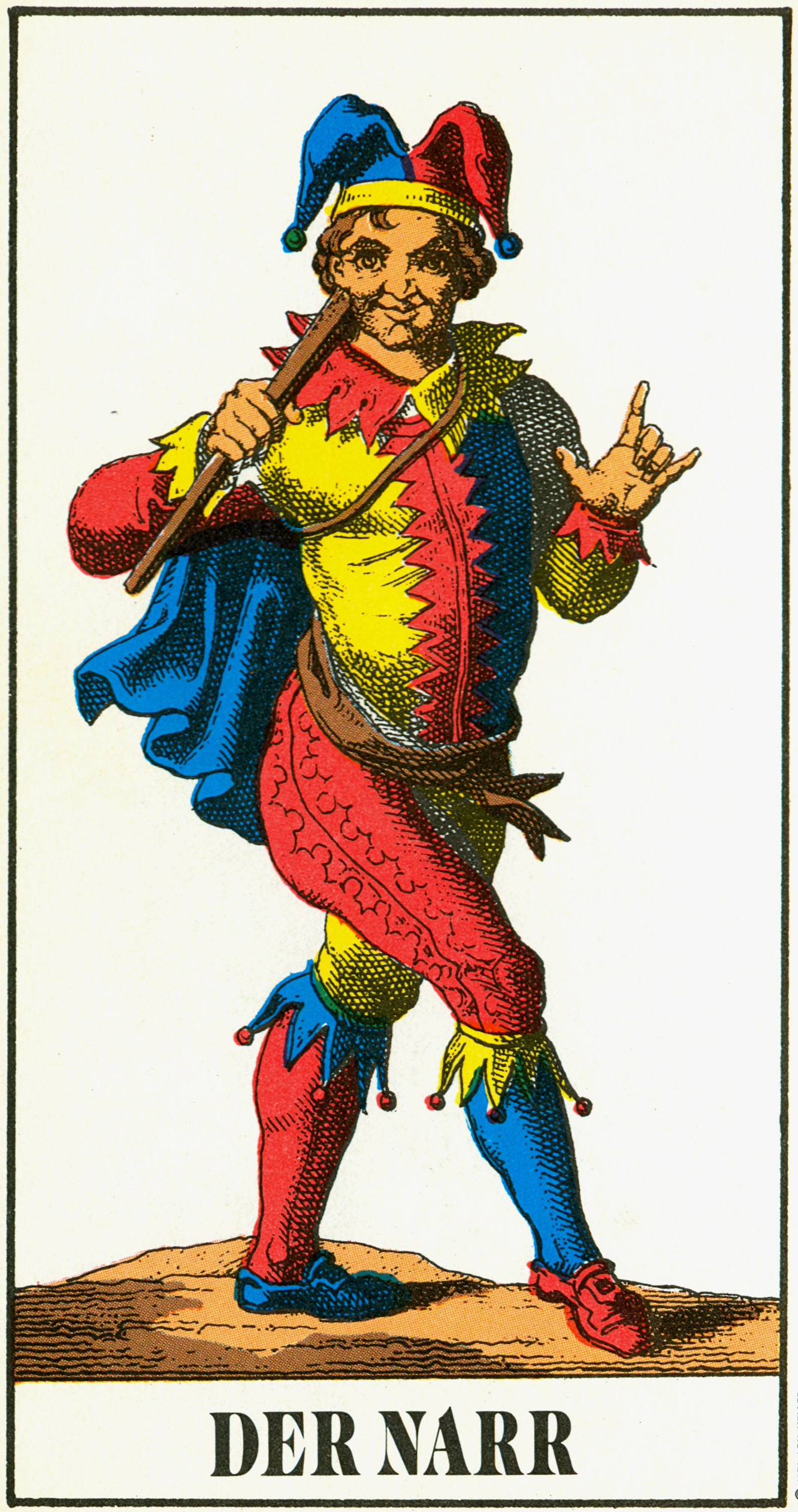
- The Fool, the highest trump or excuse in a German captioned Swiss Tarot pack
- Origin: Switzerland
- Alternative names: Trogga, Tappu, Tappä
- Type: Trick-taking
- Players: 3-8
- Skills: Tactics, Strategy
- Cards: 62
- Deck: Swiss Tarot
- Rank (high→low): Trump suit: Fool, 21-1; Long suits: K Q C J 10 9 8 7 6 5 Round suits: K Q C J 1 2 3 4 5 6
- Play: Anticlockwise
- Chance: Moderate

Related games
- Tapp-Tarock • Cego • Königrufen

Troggu is a member of the tarot family of card games. Synonyms for the game's name are: Trogga, Tappu and Tappä. It is played in the area of Visp, Switzerland, in Upper Wallis, especially in St. Niklaus and Grächen. After Troccas, it is the second most played tarot card game in Switzerland.

== History ==
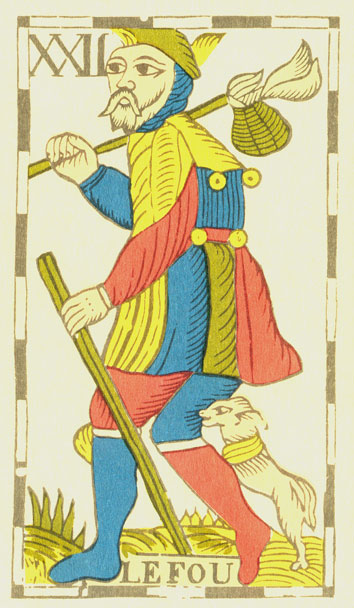
The Fool (Cartes de Suisses)

According to card game researcher, John McLeod, Troggu was probably invented in the 18th century. The reasons for this assumption concerns the rules for the Fool. In earlier Tarot card games and in modern French Tarot, the Fool is played as an "Excuse", a card which exempts the player from following suit. In modern Tarock games in such regions as Austria and Hungary, the Fool is played as Tarock XXII, the highest ranking trump. The rules of Troggu contain a mixture of both variations and may be a transitional game from the traditional rules of the Fool to the more modern one.

Troggu or a related game may have spread to Belgium in the 18th century as that would explain tarot decks sold as "Cartes de Suisses" where the Fool was numbered XXII. In 1849, for example, a pack of "Swiss Tarots, Cartes de Suisses" is advertised for sale in a catalogue. The description notes that it was made in Brussels by F. J. Vandenborre, cardmaker, and comprises 78 cards, "the Coat Cards are exceedingly curious, representing Bacchus, Love, Death, the Devil, Lightning, Sun, Moon, Stars, Day of Judgement, Fool, &c."

The closest known relatives of Troggu are the game of Tape which was played in Fribourg until the late 20th century and Dappen in Baden.

== Rules ==
The game traditionally uses the Italian suited Swiss Tarot deck but removes the 1 through 4 of the swords and batons and the 7 through 10 of the cups and coins for a total of 62 cards. Troggu players prefer the German translated version as opposed to Troccas players who use the French version. The French suited Tarot Nouveau can be a substitute if the red 7 through 10 and black 1 through 4 are removed. Like in most tarot games, the red or round suit pip cards are in reverse order.

In Troggu, there are 114 points and the cards are counted individually. The value of the cards are as follows:

Cards	Points
Trump XXI, Trump I, The Fool, Kings	5
Queens	4
Knights	3
Knaves	2
Rest of the cards	1

The game can be played by three to eight players with five to seven being ideal. Like most tarot games, the deal and play are anticlockwise. The number of cards dealt and the size of the tapp (stock) depends on the number of players involved. The player to the dealer's right makes the first bid. Players can either pass, bid for the normal game, or bid a Solo which is the highest bid. In a normal game, the declarer is called the Tappist who can exchange cards with the tapp but must not discard cards with an individual value of 5 points. In games with seven or eight players, the Tappist can call a trump that is not worth 5 points. The player who holds this card will be the Tappist's secret partner. In a Solo game, the declarer is known as the Soloist who plays alone against the others without exchanging cards with the tapp. If all players pass, each plays for him- or herself in a misère game.

The declarer (or player to the dealer's right in a misère game) leads to the first trick; the others must follow suit if they can. A player who is void in the suit, must play a trump. Only when void in the suit led and in trumps can any card be sloughed. The winner of the trick leads the next one. The Fool is the highest trump but if it is the last trump in the player's possession, the player can elect to play another card instead of following suit. Once this occurs, the Fool is no longer a trump but an excuse that must be reserved for the last trick.

== Bibliography ==
- Smith, John Russell (1849). Miscellanea Curiosa et Bibliotheca Antiqua: A Catalogue of a Singular and Curious Collection of Topographical Prints and Drawings... London: C. & J. Adlard.
