= Troccas =

Tarot card game

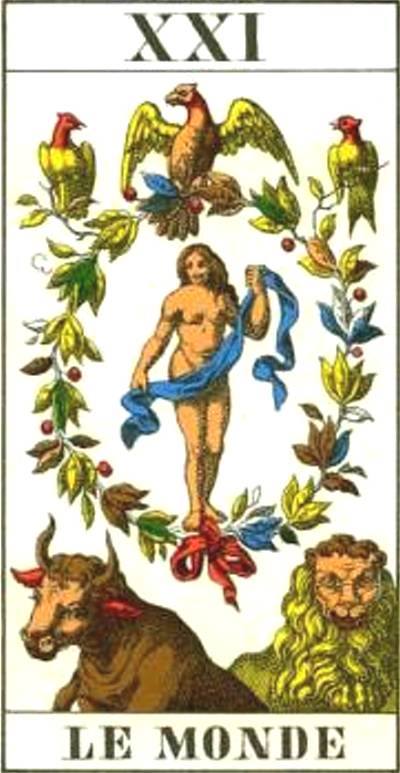
The World, the highest trump in a French captioned Swiss Tarot pack

Troccas is a member of the Tarot family of card games. It is a four player game played in the Romansh speaking part of the canton Grisons of Switzerland. It is not known exactly how this game entered Switzerland but it is generally thought to have arrived from Italy during the 17th century.

Troccas players use Swiss Tarot packs, sometimes called "1JJ" or "Jupiter and Juno" packs because they substitute Jupiter and Juno for the Pope and Papess of the Tarot of Marseilles. The deck's captions are usually in French or German, but a version with English captions has been published.

== The cards ==
The 78-card Swiss Tarot is traditionally used but it can be substituted by a Tarot Nouveau deck. Swiss Tarot packs use Italian suits (swords, sticks, cups, and coins) while Tarot Nouveau uses French suits. Cards use traditional ranking, where red (or round) suits rank in reverse: K, Q, C, V, 1, 2, 3, 4, 5, 6, 7, 8, 9, 10.

Swiss Tarot cards are referred to in the game by their Romansh (Rhæto-Romanic) names, but bear legends in French or German. Troccas players prefer the French version as opposed to Troggu players who use the German version.

== Card points ==
At the end of the game, cards are counted in groups of four, subtracting three points for each group. The dealer (in Romansh, scartist) will have two odd cards, counting for combined value, minus one point. The full deck totals 72 points, and cards are worth the following: kings and honours (1 and 21 of trump, and the Fool) five, queens four, cavaliers three, jacks two, everything else one.

== The deal ==
Before the game starts, each player cuts for trump. The two highest and the two lowest form partnerships. The dealing and play are counterclockwise. Traditionally, the deck is cut and not shuffled.

Each player is given nineteen cards; Dealer takes the last two; thus having a hand of twenty-two cards. The last card dealt to each player is traditionally turned up. Usually, the cards are dealt in packets of six, six, and seven, with dealer taking the last nine.

A team that is losing by at least nine points may request that the deal be in packets of nine and ten, with dealer taking twelve; a team losing by at least eighteen points may request that the deal be in a single packet each (nineteen cards and twenty-one for the dealer).

After the dealing of each packet, players can give coded statements known as tschintschar to their partner to decide whether or not to have the cards redealt. All players must give consent to cancel the deal. These are the ones allowed in tournaments:

After being dealt six or twelve cards, one may say:

tschintschar	Translation	Meaning
strusch in	just one	Only one honour (5 point card)
in	one	Two honour cards
tric e trac	this and that	Half of my hand are trumps
jeu mirel or aunc sis	I see it or another six	Continue dealing because my hand is good
autras	other cards	My hand is bad and we should abandon the deal
nuot or lavadas	nothing or washout	My cards are worthless
il narr	the Fool	I have the Fool with some trumps
il narr blut	the naked Fool	I have the Fool but no trumps
jeu lasch liber	I'll let you choose	Choose to continue or redeal

After all cards have been dealt, one may say:

tschintschar	Translation	Meaning
in trochetg		I have five or six trumps
ina trocca		I have seven or eight trumps
in pèr tunnels		I have four or five small trumps
da Medel	from the Medel	I have eight to ten high trumps
da Tujetsch	from Tujetsch	I have many face cards
ina cuort or ina famiglia	one court or one family	I have all the face cards of one suit
in pass	one step	I have two honours with six or seven trumps
jeu gidel	I help	I have a good hand
pli bugen autras	I prefer other cards	My hand is mediocre
jeu sun buc cheu	I am not here	I have nothing
fai scart or nus dein	Go discard or we play	Start the game

After all cards are dealt, the dealer has the privilege of forcing a new hand to be dealt if the dealer's hand is void of trumps.

== Play ==
The dealer discards two cards, which may not include Kings or Honours (the I or XXI of trump, as well as the Fool [il narr]). Other trumps may be discarded, though this is inadvisable. A good strategy is to eliminate a suit in which one is short, to allow trumping when this suit comes up in play; if this is impossible, it is advisable to discard the lowest two cards of a suit in which one is long.

The dealer leads the first trick with any card; each player in turn, moving to the right, must follow suit. If this is impossible, they must trump, and if this is impossible as well, they can play any card but can not win. The winner of the trick leads the next one.

The Fool can be played in any trick. It excuses the player from following suit. If the side that wins the trick did not play the Fool, they must return it to their opponents, in exchange for a one-point card. If the Fool leads a trick, the next player's card determines the trick's suit. The Fool can only be lost if the player's side fails to win any tricks.

The most distinguishing aspect of Troccas which separates it from other tarot games is a rule involving the king and jack of each suit. When a suit is led for the first time and that suit's king is played in it, whoever wins that trick can demand that the jack of that suit be surrendered (if it hasn't already been played). The jack's owner takes back his or her original card and exchanges it with the jack unless they had played the queen, cavalier, or the Fool. If the player who played the king also held the jack, they can play both cards together. After the trick, they can demand a card of the same suit from the other players. This rule has no effect if the jack was one of the two cards discarded by the dealer.

In some regions, a player with the highest unplayed trump can let the partner know by knocking on the table.

== Scoring ==
Players win or lose game points equal to the card points over or below thirty-six; in practice, each point generally corresponds to a small stake.
