= John of Rheinfelden =

German writer (1340–1377)

John of Rheinfelden (German: Johannes von Rheinfelden), also Johannes Teuto and John of Basle (born c. 1340), was a Dominican friar and writer who published the oldest known description in Europe of playing cards.

== Life and works ==
Brother John was born around 1340 in Freiburg im Breisgau. Little is known of his life, it is only substantiated by his treatise (Traktat), published in Basel 1377, and the personal information it contains. He was probably a member of Basel's Dominican monastery, but lived in Freiburg im Breisgau. He is usually known as John of Rheinfelden, although Dummett says this is "probably wrong."

He wrote the treatise De moribus et disciplina humanae conversationis id est ludus cartularum (also referred to as Ludus cartularum moralisatus), the oldest surviving detailed description of playing cards in Europe from the Middle Ages, which he wrote in 1377 as bans on playing cards began to proliferate. The tract is modelled on the "Chess Allegory" (Schachallegorie) of fellow friar James of Cessoles. Card games are attested for the first time in Europe by the Signoria of Florence on 23 March 1377. It is likely that they originally came from China and probably only reached Europe via India and Egypt a decade earlier. So Rheinfelden's treatise was very topical. Strasbourg, about 50 kilometres from Freiburg, became a centre of playing card production in the 15th century. In addition to other versions, the author mentions the still common 4x13 sheet as the basic template, whereby the King, Ober and Unter ("marshals") are mentioned as court cards, but Maids and Queens are also known. He does not state what suit symbols were used.

In the foreword, the author explains the purpose of his treatise: firstly to explain the pack of cards, its components and the rules of the game, secondly to derive moral instructions for nobles from the card game with reference to the different "courts" (suits) of the pack, thirdly similar instructions for other people by assigning professions to numerical cards.

Johannes writes that the newly introduced cards seemed like a revelation to him and the knowledge that they could be used as a means of understanding and explaining the world had moved him. He uses his description of the card figures as the starting point for a broad presentation and interpretation of the corresponding functions at court. Thus, the tract also gives a general insight into the medieval way of thinking, how the social order is structured. He presents his enormous wealth of knowledge, for example by referring to the Bible, the Latin classics, Boëthius, Church Father Isidor and Doctor of the Church, Thomas Aquinas. Some of Rheinfelden's views seem natural to modern people and he is not afraid of more controversial topics.

The original treatise, which was probably illustrated, has not survived (it may have been destroyed in the Franco-Prussian War) but has been handed down in four expanded manuscripts:

- Hs. F IV.43 (University Library of Basel), 1429 (doi:10.5076/e-codices-ubb-F-IV-0043)
- Hs. 4143 (Austrian National Library Vienna), 1472 (Digitalisat online, Johannes' Treatise begins at fol. 88r, d. i. p. 181 of the digitalised copy)
- Hs. 225 (library of the University of Utrecht), 1472
- Hs. Egerton 2419 (British Library, London), 1472

So far there is no complete printed edition, a text-critical edition by Arne Jönsson, professor at the University of Lund, is in preparation.

== Literature ==
- Dummett, Michael (1980). The Game of Tarot. London: Duckworth. ISBN 0-7156-1014-7.
- Geisberg, Max (1910). Das Kartenspiel der Königlichen Staats- u. Altertümer-Sammlung in Stuttgart, Strasbourg, pp. 14 f. (Reprint: Alte Spielkarten) (= Studien zur deutschen Kunstgeschichte, Vol. 66, 132, 205), pp. 116f. Baden-Baden 1973. With an extract of the first chapter of the treatise.
- Jönsson, Arne (2005). Card-playing as a Mirror of Society - On Johannes of Rheinfelden's Ludus cartularum moralisatus. In: Ferm, Olle och Volker Honemann (eds.), Chess and Allegory in the Middle Ages (Sällskapet Runica et Mediævalia, Münster, Stockholm and Uppsala Universities), Stockholm 2005, pp. 359–372.
- Jönsson, Arne (1998). Der Ludus cartularum moralisatus des Johannes von Rheinfelden. In: Schweizer Spielkarten, Vol. 1: Die Anfänge im 15. und 16. Jahrhundert, pp. 135–147. Schaffhausen
- Lumpe, Adolf (1992). "JOHANNES von Rheinfelden (J. Teuto, J. v. Basel)". In Bautz, Friedrich Wilhelm (ed.). Biographisch-Bibliographisches Kirchenlexikon (BBKL) (in German). Vol. 3. Herzberg: Bautz. cols. 539–540. ISBN 3-88309-035-2.
- Rosenfeld, Hellmut (1958–60). "Das Alter der Spielkarten in Europa und im Orient". Archiv für Geschichte des Buchwesens. 2: 778–786.
- Rosenfeld, Hellmut (1960). "Die Beziehung der europäischen Spielkarten zum Orient und zum Ur-Schach". Archiv für Kulturgeschichte. 42: 1–36. doi:10.7788/akg-1960-jg02. S2CID 180731496.
- Rosenfeld, Hellmut (1970). "Zur Vor- u. Frühgeschichte und Morphogenese von Kartenspiel und Tarock". Archiv für Kulturgeschichte. 52: 65–94. doi:10.7788/akg.1970.52.1.65. S2CID 183892886.
- Rosenfeld, Hellmut (1974). "Johannes von Rheinfelden". Neue Deutsche Biographie (in German). Vol. 10. Berlin: Duncker & Humblot. p. 567. (full text online).
- Lexikon für Theologie und Kirche, Vol. V, p. 1075
