= Ganjapa =

Card game from Odisha, India

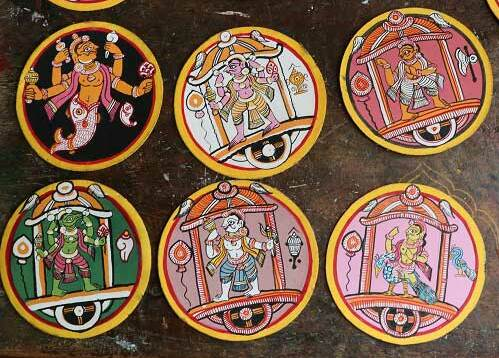
Ganjapa cards

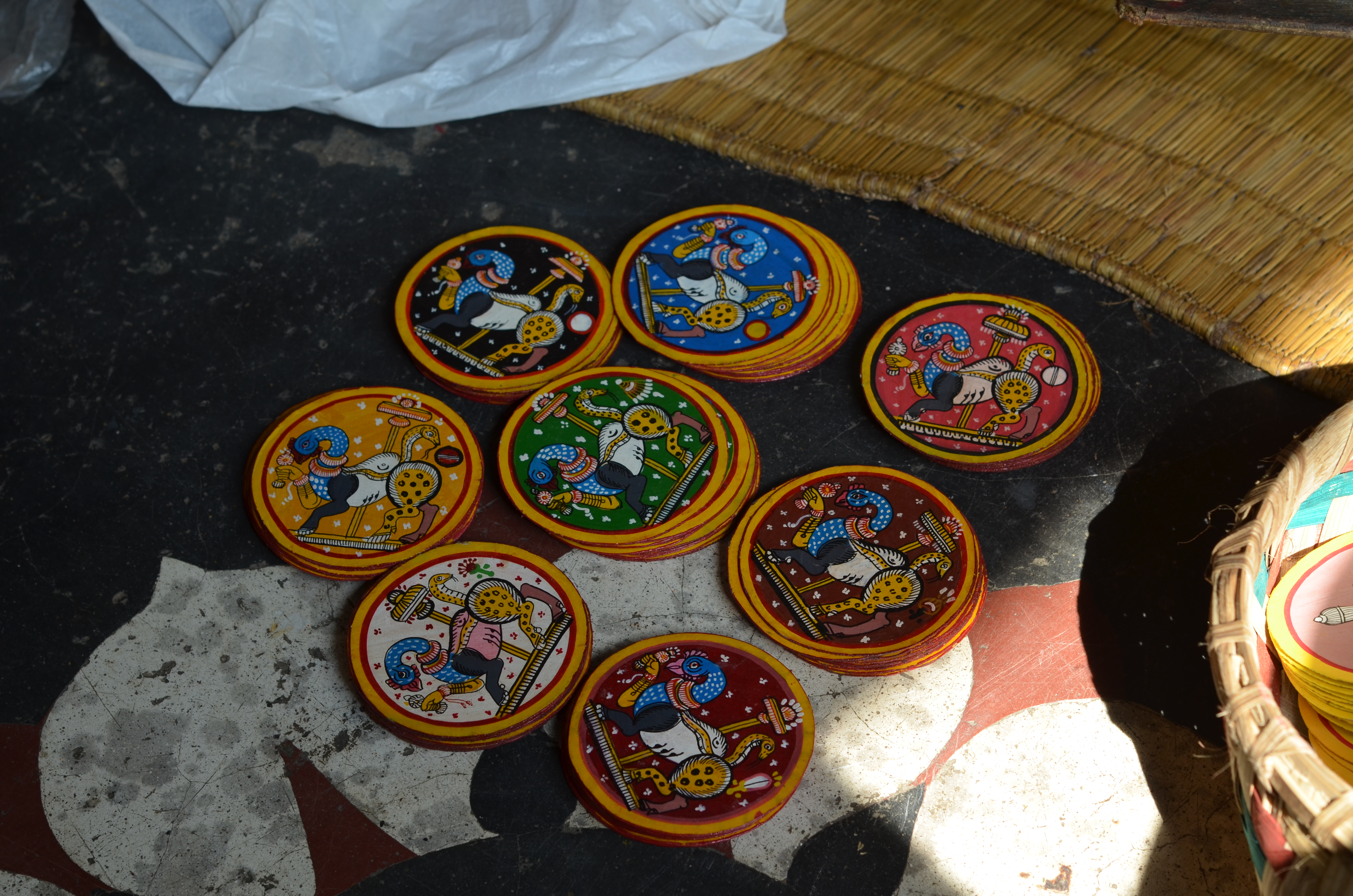
"Atharangi Ganjapa" cards painted with traditional Pattachitra painting of Krishna in his Nabagunjara form

Gånjåpā (Odia: ଗଞ୍ଜପା) are the traditional playing cards from the Indian state Odisha. It can also refer to the trick-taking card game that they are used for. It is played with circular shaped Pattachitra painted cards. Originated in the 16th century, Ganjaku is a recreational game for male members of the Odia society, primarily villagers, kings and their courtmen. Ganjapa is played as "Chārirångi" (cards of 4 colors), "Āṭhårångi" (cards of 8 colors), "Dåsårångi" (cards of 10 colors), "Bārårångi" (cards of 12 colors), "Chåudårångi" (cards of 14 colors) and "Sohåḷårångi" (cards of 16 colors). The variation of this game influenced by Persian card game Ganjifeh is known as "Mughal Ganjifa". The game is popular in Puri and Ganjam district of Odisha. As a result of the relative isolation of Odisha in the past, Ganjapa developed very differently from the Ganjifa found in the rest of India. Odisha has by far the largest community of Ganjifa players and manufacturers.

== Etymology ==
The Odia word Ganjapa is believed to be related to "Ganjifa" (originated from Persian word Ganjifeh) that was popular by the Mughal emperors.

== History ==
The first written document regarding the play dates back to Mamluk times 1399 – 1412, mentioning about the winning of a ransom by Mamluk’s army officer by playing Kanjafa. The Topkapı Palace in Istanbul has a collection of a set of Mamluk cards. Earliest mention of Ganjifa is found in 1527 AD during Mughal emperor Babur's rule.

== Artwork ==
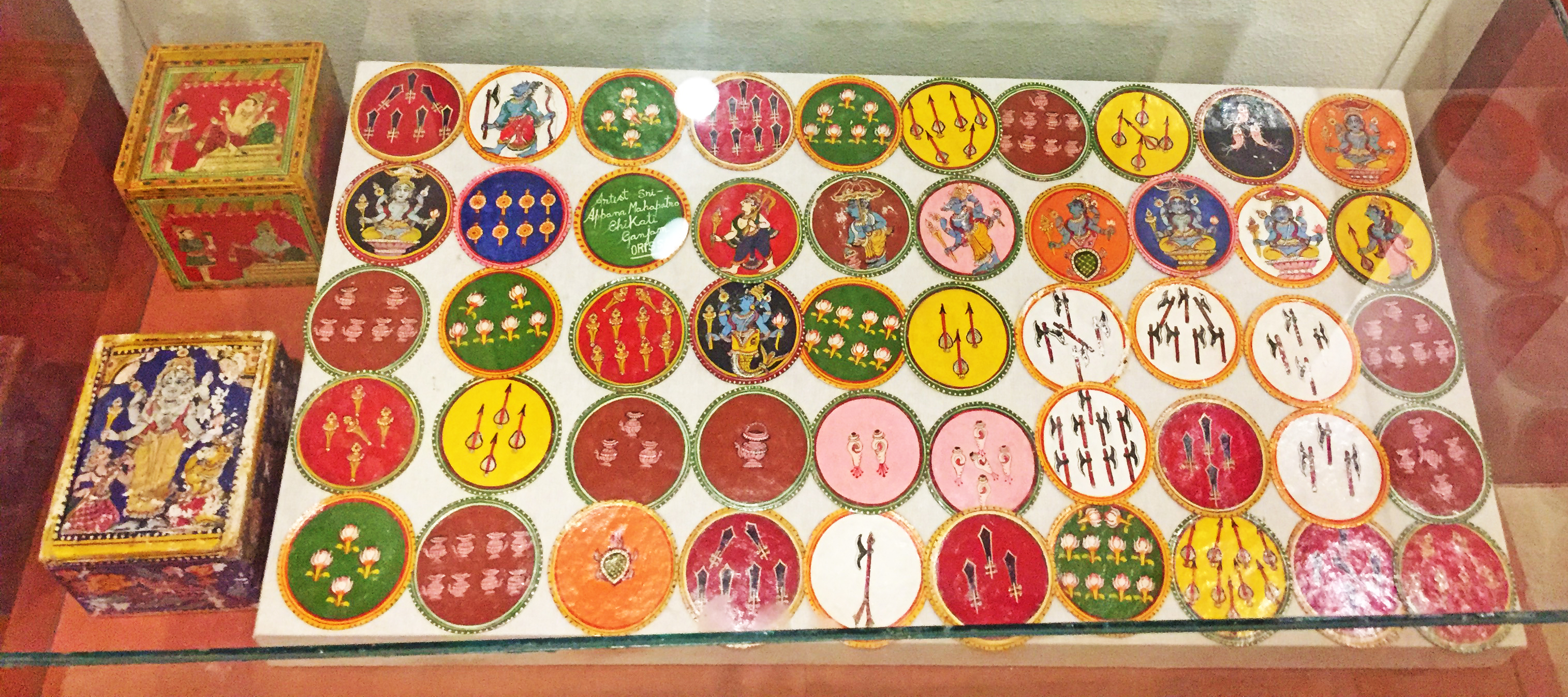
Ganjapa cards

Artworks used on Ganjapa cards are Pattachitra painting. Pattachitra motifs and patterns with figurative representations of dancers and other people, and of the Ramayana, Dasavatara of Hindu god Vishnu, and other deities of Hindu mythology are painted on the round cards. Artworks always have traditional Odishan art, and vary from region to region and community to community in Odisha. Ganjapa artwork from Ganjam varies from that of Puri.

Ganjapa appears very differently from Ganjifa found in other parts of India as well. In Moghul Ganjapa, the suit-symbols are now highly stylized and abstract. Dasavatara Ganjifa contains only 10 suits but its Ganjapa equivalent can contain 12, 16, 20, or 24 suits to make the game more challenging. The Ramayana type is presently unique to Odisha and perhaps the most popular in the present. Also produced are ones with birds as suit-symbols, a relatively modern invention marketed to tourists.

== Card making ==
Girl painting Ganjapa cards at Raghurajpur craft's village. Puri

The card making procedure resembles that of Pattachitra. Layers of glue made by grinding tamarind seeds are pasted on cloth and dried. Circular shaped cards then are carved using hollow iron cylinders. Two circular sheets are joined together to make a card. After drying natural dyes made of lac, limestone (for white color), coal-carbon (for black) and tamarind (for yellow) are used to paint figures.

== Variations ==
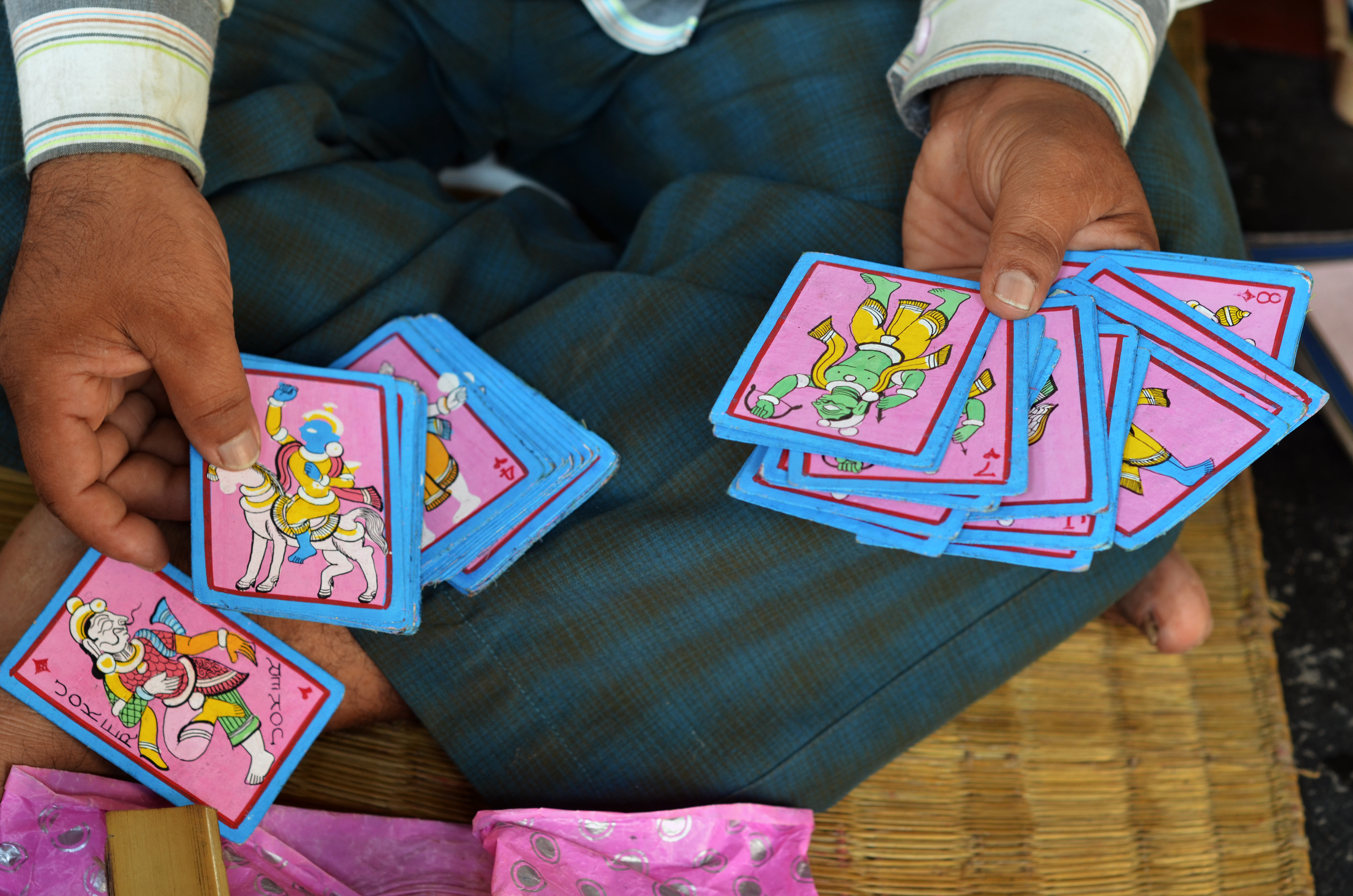
Charirangi Ganjapa cards

Gånjapā is played as "Chārirångi" (cards of 4 colors or 4 suits in a pack of card), "Āṭhårångi" (cards of 8 colors), "Dåsårångi" (cards of 10 colors), "Bārårångi" (cards of 12 colors), "Chåudårångi" (cards of 14 colors) and "Sohåḷårångi" (cards of 16 colors). Each color has 12 cards that makes the total number of cards an integer of number associated with the card's name, i.e. a "Charirangi Ganjapa" has 48 cards similar to French-suited playing cards, "Atharangi Ganjapa" has 96 cards and so on. Each color is recognizable by a unique background color. Each suit contains 10 numbered cards (1-10), a king and vizier. The king possesses the highest value followed by the vizier and then the numerical series in descending order. The king's card has a painting of him in sitting posture with legs folded at the knees (known as "chaukå/chekā māṛi båsā"), with the vizier's card with him standing. The king is also seen riding a chariot with the minister mounted on a horse. Some of the cards have the king with two heads and the minister with one head. Signature figures from Pattachitra like imaginary figure with human head and four legs of four different animals are also seen in cards.

== See also ==
- Ganjifa
- Dashabatar Cards - West Bengal variant
