= Dashabatar Cards =

Indian card game

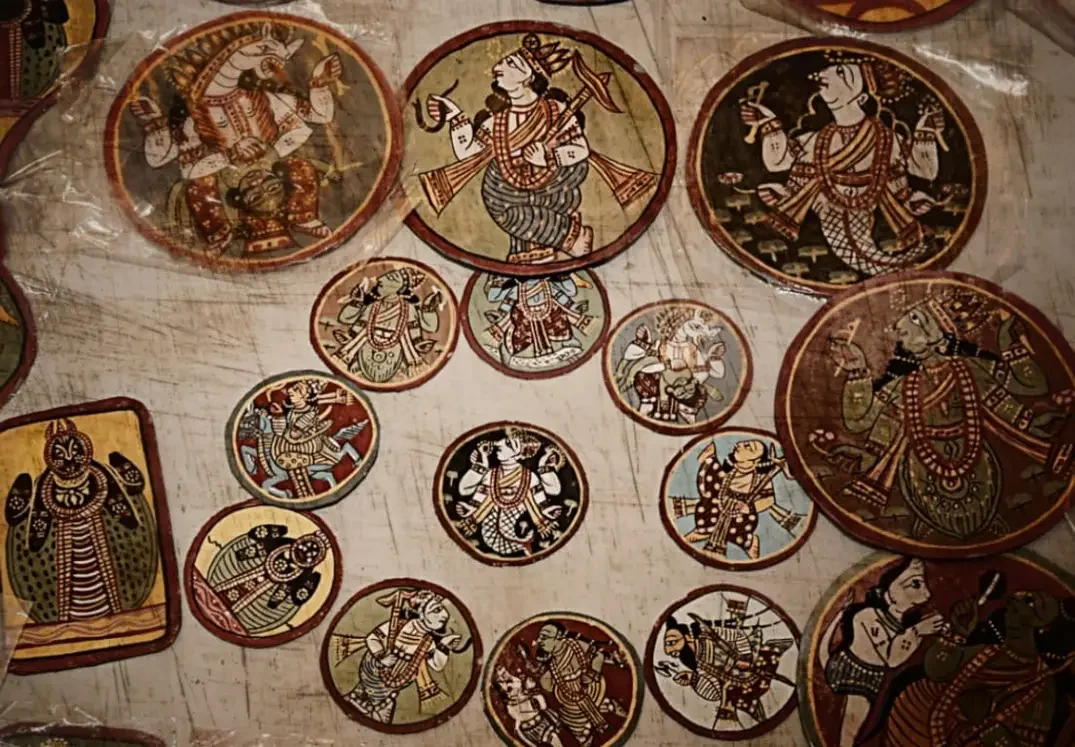
Dashavatara cards of Bishnupur

Dashabatar Cards (দশাবতার তাস) or Dashavatari Ganjifa (Note: variant spelling due to Betacism) are playing cards from West Bengal used to play certain games. They first originated in Bishnupur, a town in Bankura District. King Bir Hambir is attributed to the invention of these cards in the 16th century. The ten avatars of Bishnu are featured in the cards. It is a unique example of Bengal's folk art.

== Origin ==
In 1592, Bir Hambir became king of Bishnupur. He had a great relationship with Akbar, who had his own 12-suited pack of Ganjifa cards. During a visit to Akbar's court, Bir Hambur saw Akbar's cards and was inspired to create new and unique cards featuring the ten avatars of Bishnu. According to his directive, an artist from Bishnupur, Kartik Faujdar, created the first Dashabatar Cards. Kings of Mallabhum play with these cards at their leisure.

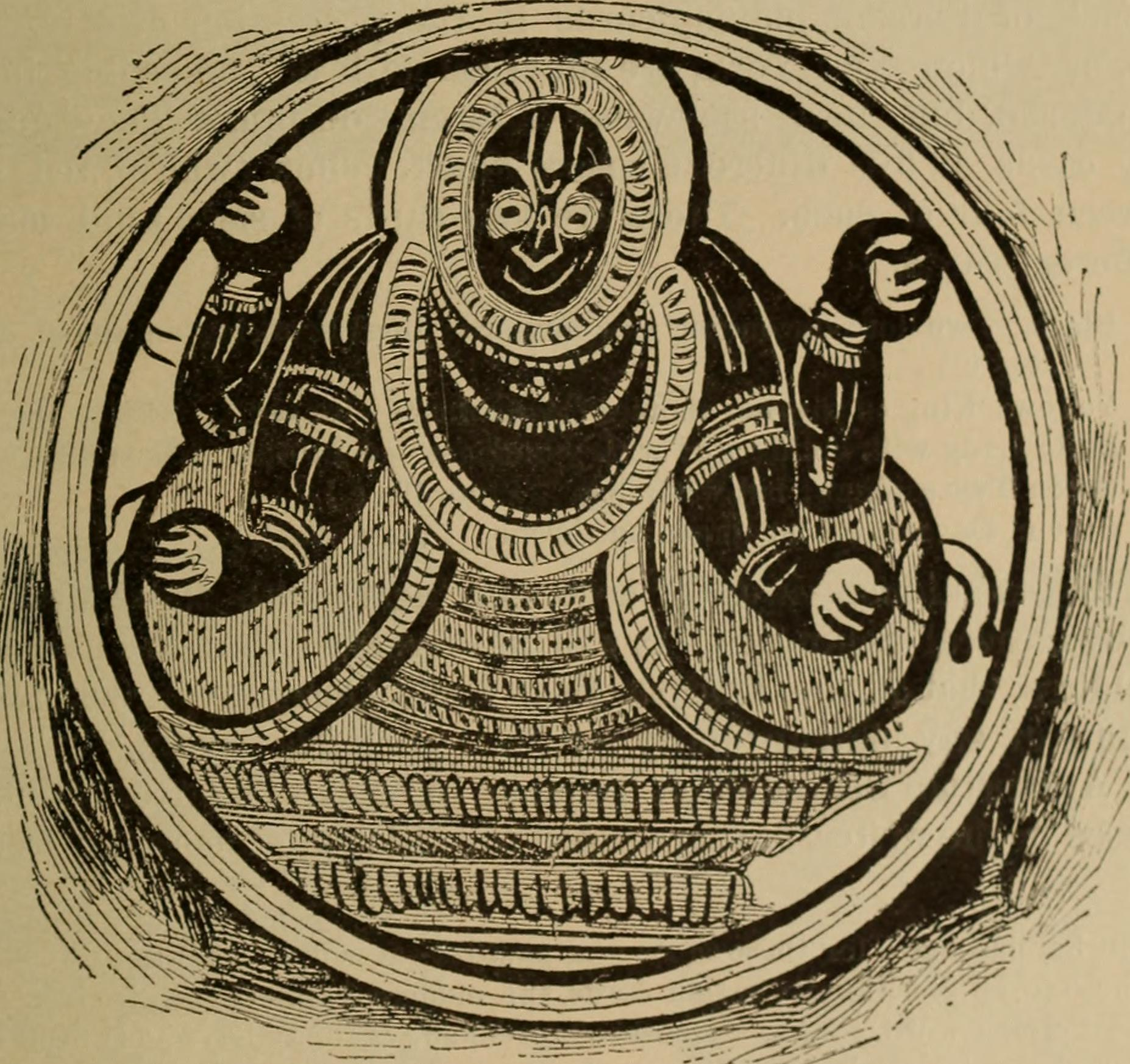
Jagannath/Buddha card

Indian scholar Hara Prasad Shastri believes that these cards originated earlier in the 8th century.

Prabhat Kumar Saha, an expert on Dashavatar cards, said: "Malla dynasty ruled from about 12th century AD to 1622". He confirmed that the Foujdars were the only makers of these cards in Bengal.

Sital Fouzdar claims to be the 87th generation of artisans. Nowadays, Vidyut Fouzdar makes them.

== Method of manufacture ==
The artists from the Faujdar family of Bishnupur specialise in making these cards. First, three pieces of cloth are pasted together using glue made from tamarind seeds. After the glue dries, a layer of chalk dust is applied to the cards. Both sides are evened out with a smooth stone. The cards are then cut into circles with a 4.5-inch radius. Various deities and their suit symbols are painted on these cards using various colours. On the card backs, a layer of lac and vermillion is applied.

== Cards ==
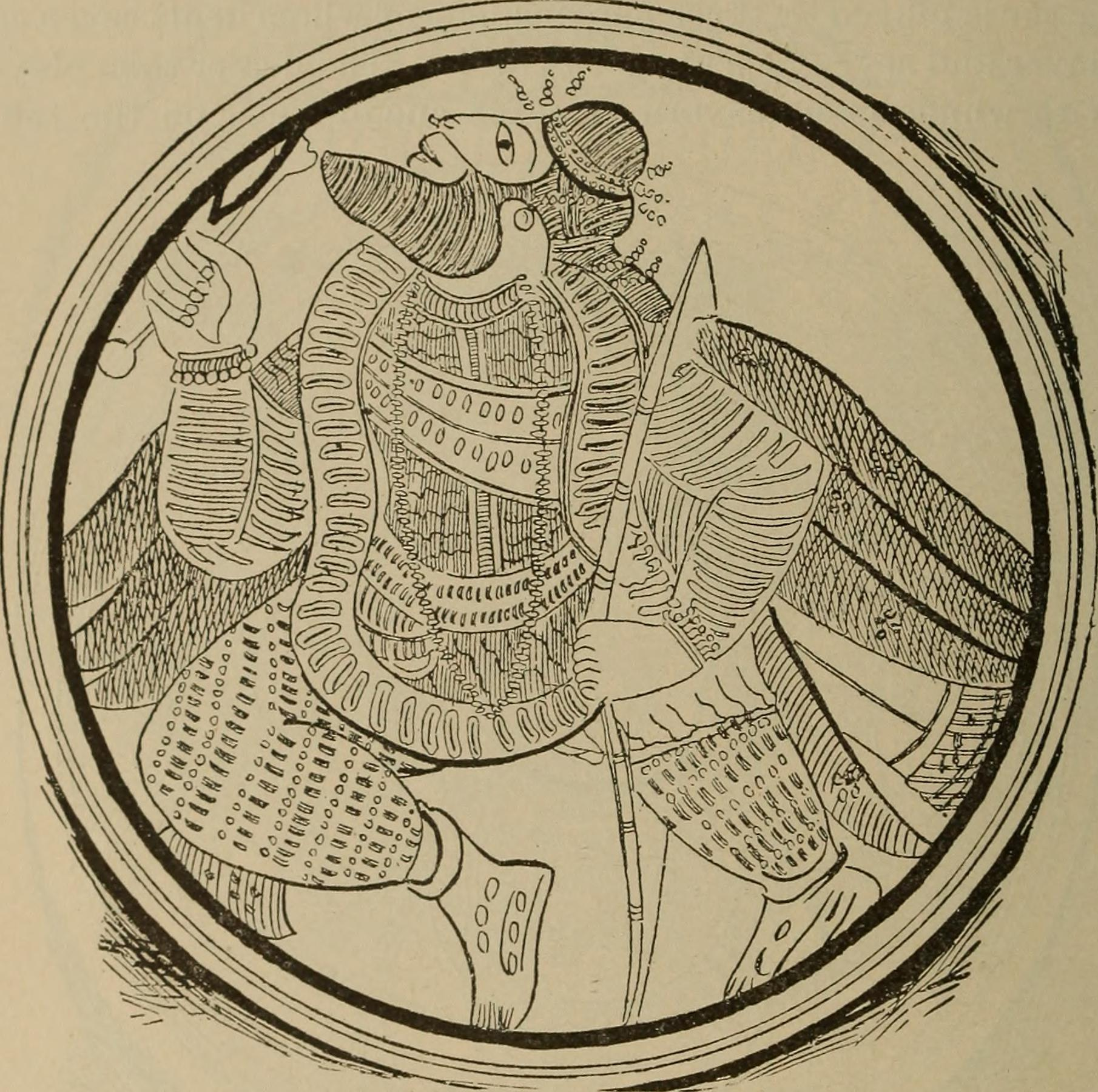
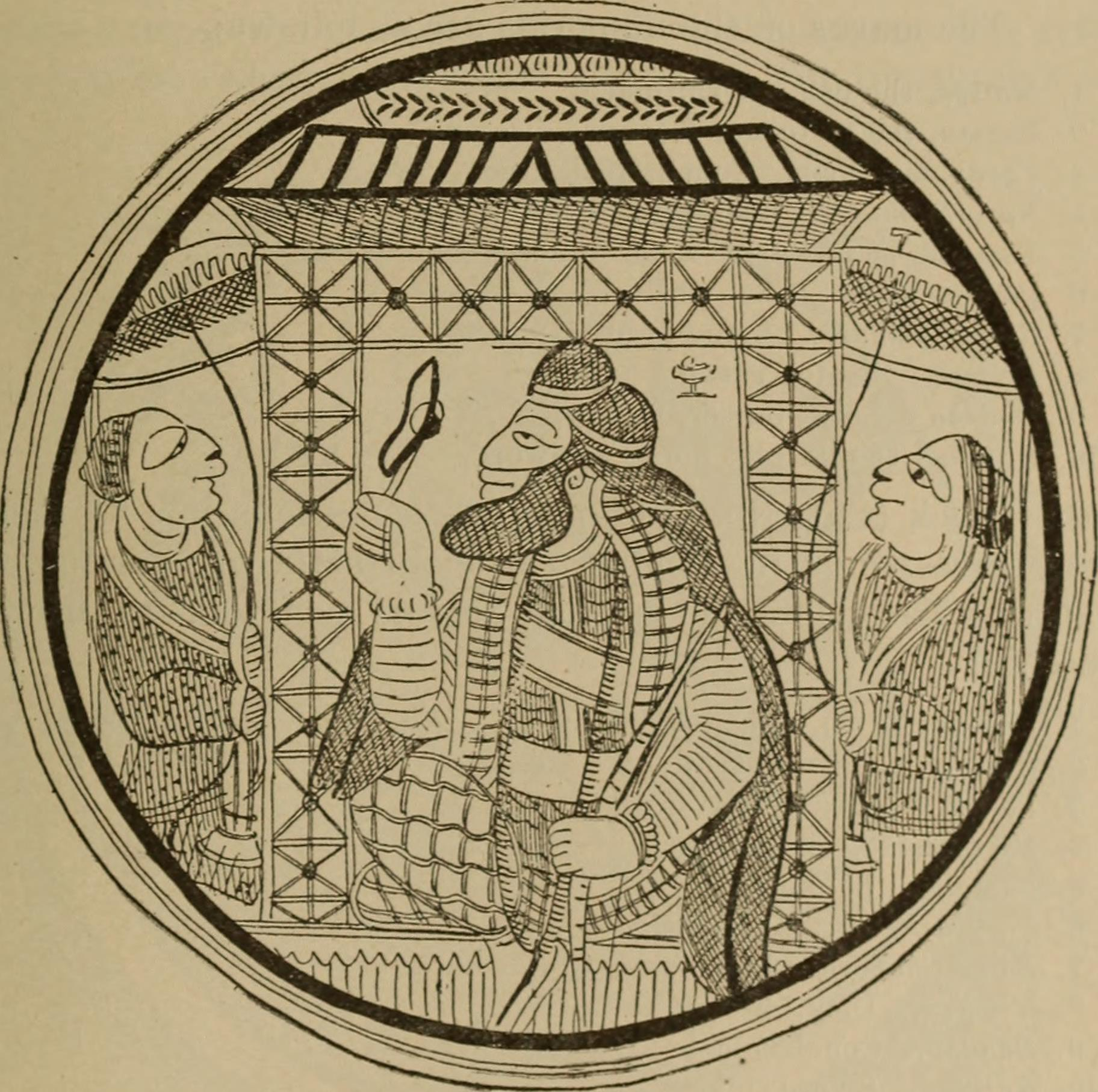
Raja and Pradhan ranks from Parashurama suit

Dashavatar cards feature ten suits and twelve ranks, with one of the ten avatars of Vishnu on each suit. Similar to most other Ganjifa cards, the twelve ranks are made up of ten pip cards and two court cards, the King (called Raja) and Vizier (called Pradhan). Both court cards depict the same avatar for its suit, but one is differentiated by being enthroned in a sort of temple with attendants on either side. One possible ordering, suit symbols, and color backgrounds is as follows:

1. Matsya (fish) black
2. Kurma (tortoise) brown
3. Baraha (conch) dark green
4. Nrisingha (difficult to discern, flower or mace?) blue
5. Baaman (round vessel) blue
6. Parshuram (ax) white
7. Ram (arrow) red
8. Balaram or Krishna (pestle) green
9. Buddha or Jagannath (lotus flower) yellow
10. Kalki (sword) red

Another possible ordering, symbols, and colors is as follows:

1. Matsya (fish) red
2. Kurma (tortoise) red
3. Baraha (boar) yellow
4. Nrisingha (lion) green
5. Baaman (round vessels) green
6. Parshuram (ax) brown
7. Ram (bow and arrow) yellow
8. Balaram or Krishna (difficult to discern, yellow disk with red dot?) brown
9. Buddha or Jagannath (conch shell) black
10. Kalki (sword) black

A third order and symbols is as follows:

1. Matsya (fish)
2. Kurma (turtle)
3. Baraha (boar)
4. Nrisingha (lion, or half-man, half-lion)
5. Buddha or Jagannath (conch shell)
6. Baaman (round vessel)
7. Ram (bow and arrow)
8. Balaram or Krishna (round plate)
9. Parshuram (ax)
10. Kalki (sword)

The Dashavatar card game is a complicated one. It is played using 120 cards with numerous rules and regulations. It is played by three persons mainly in Sawantwadi in Maharashtra, India, although it is played by five persons in Bishnupur, West Bengal. It is considered the most popular Ganjifa set played throughout India, and depending on demand, this set may be extended up to 24 suits to encompass more major deities like Brahma, Shiva, Ganesha, Kartikeya, Surya, Chandra, etc.

== See also ==
- Ganjifa
- Ganjapa - Odisha variant

== Image gallery ==
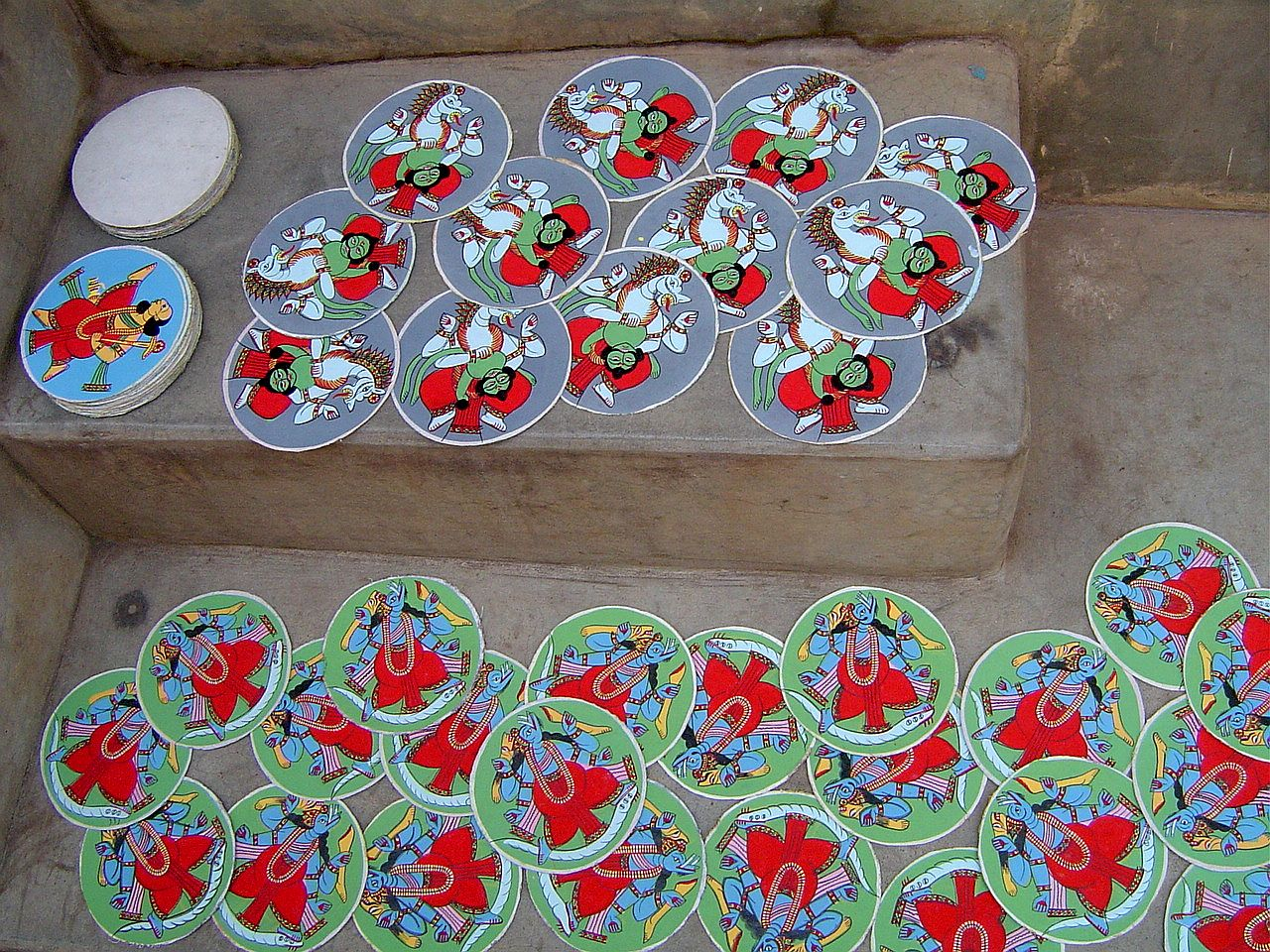
Artist making Dashavatara cards of Bishnupur

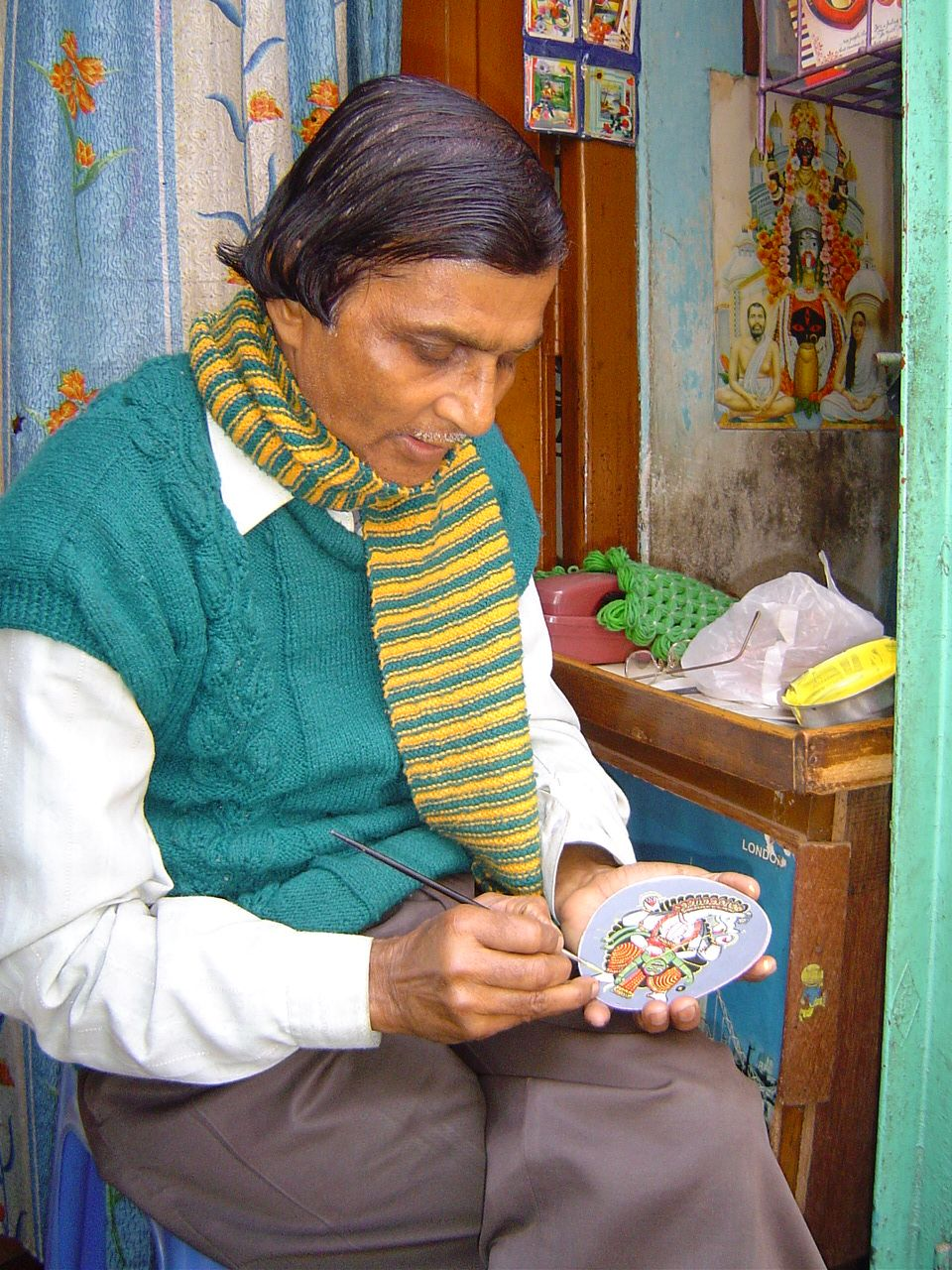
Artist making Dashavatara cards of Bishnupur

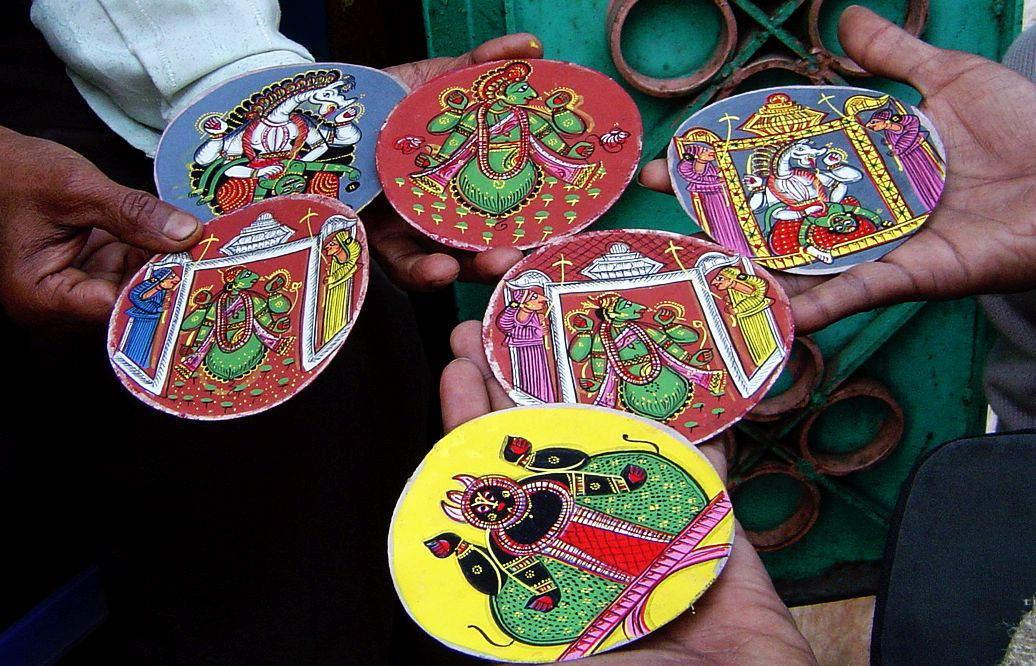
Artist making Dashavatara cards of Bishnupur
