= As-Nas =

Traditional Persian card game

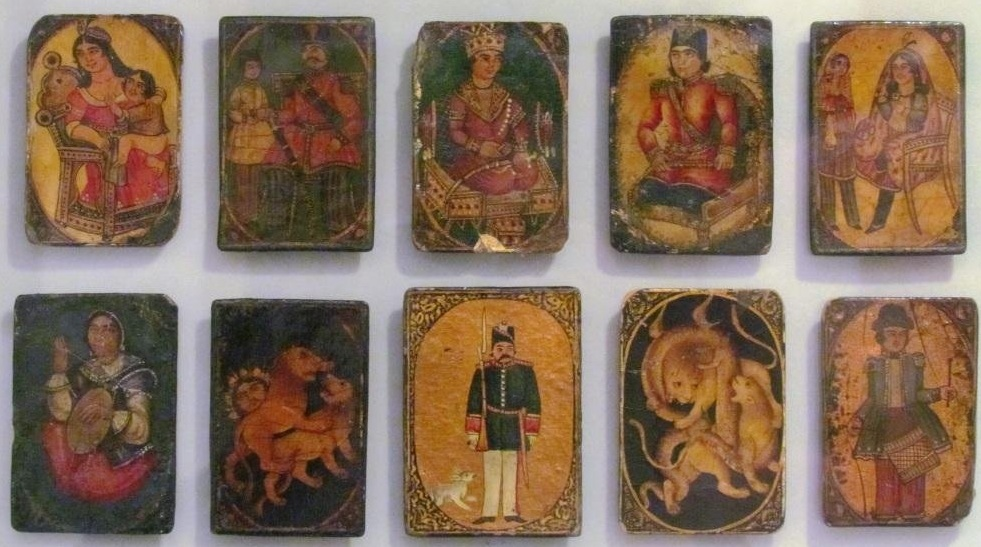
As-Nas cards

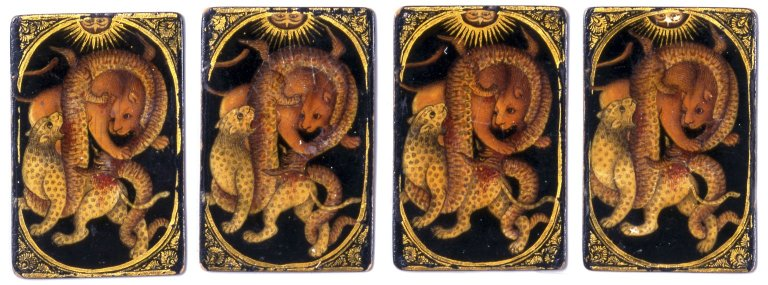
As

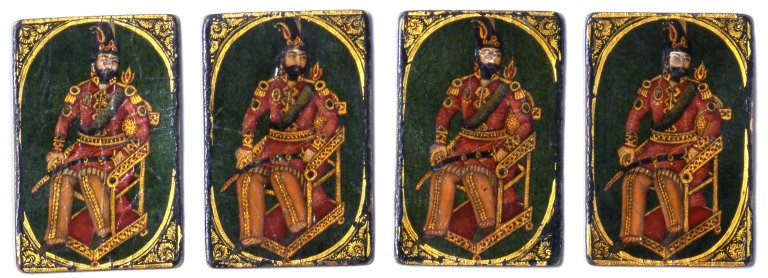
Shah

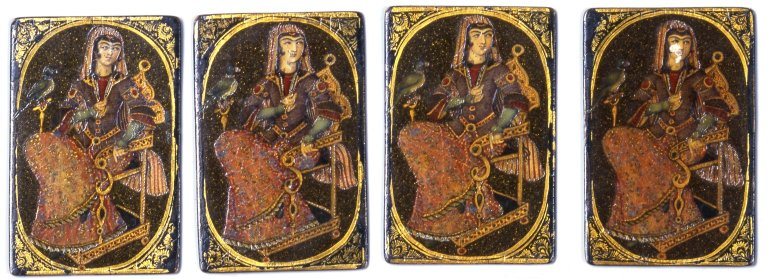
Bibi

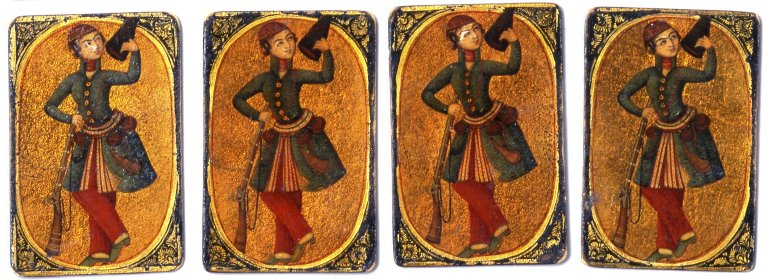
Serbaz

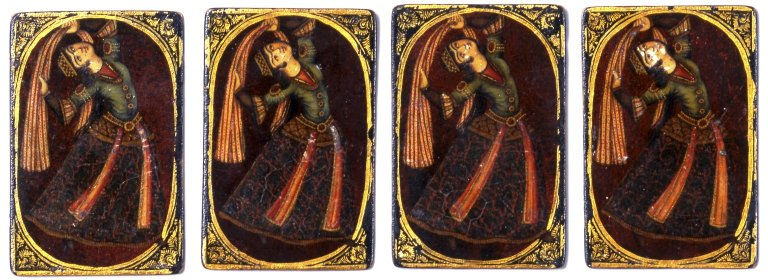
Couli

As-Nas (Persian: آس ناس) is a card game or type of playing cards that were used in Iran.

== Description ==
The design of the packs is simple, consisting of only five individual card designs, each with a distinctive background colour. The designs are repeated either four or five times, to make a total of 20 or 25 cards. As Nas cards are rectangular in format, and relatively small, for example 4 cm × 6 cm (1.6 in × 2.4 in). Like Ganjifa cards, they are generally hand-painted, although some later examples use a collage technique to add a ready-made printed image onto the painted background. The designs are 'single-headed' (not doubled, like modern standard playing cards), and have no indexes or titles. However the background colours enable players to immediately recognise what cards they have in hand. Generally the cards have a decorative border, often with an oval shape set in a rectangular frame.

There is considerable variety in the imagery used. Generally the 5 designs have an ace featuring an animal design, and four court cards. This configuration may explain the name As-Nas. As is the term for the 'ace' card. Nas, in both Arabic and Persian, means 'people' or 'mankind'. Hence As-Nas would refer to pack with aces and a series of people. The different figures show people from various social classes. Typically the designs of the cards are as follows, from highest to lowest:

- As (آس): Ace. Common designs include a lion with the sun or moon in the background; Lions and/or dragons in combat, the beasts biting each other, sometimes with leopards or other animals added; a hunter on horseback, being attacked by a wild beast.
- Shah (شاه): King, often sitting on a throne, or sometimes on horseback.
- Bibi (بی‌بی): Lady, often shown seated, holding a child.
- Serbaz (سرباز): Soldier.
- Couli or Lakat (لکات): the lowest card, generally a dancing-girl or a pair of dancers, or musician.

Other than the image types described above, various alternative versions can be found, for example packs featuring only flowers, and erotic or obscene versions.

== History of As-Nas ==
For a long period As-Nas cards existed alongside the more ancient Ganjifa types. Wilkins claims that accounts of As-Nas date back to the 17th century, and at that time a 25-card pack was used, with 5 suits, each suit having one court card and four numeral cards. Cards from the 19th century with the classic As-Nas designs can be found in various museum collections. Some rarer examples are estimated to be from the late 18th century. According to Murdoch Smith, by 1877 As-Nas cards were 'gradually falling into disuse, being replaced by European' types. Following the Foreign Trade Monopoly Act of 1931, a monopoly over playing cards was established in Iran to control imports and production. The British playing card manufacturer De La Rue was commissioned to provide cards during the 1930s. The cards featured indexing in Persian and court card images that evoked Persian history. Nonetheless the cards used standard Western style suit symbols (hearts, clubs, spades and diamonds). The game of As-Nas largely fell out of fashion by around 1945. However, As-Nas may have persisted a little longer in rural areas. In his work published in the 1960s, Arasteh writes that "rural life in Iran revolves around traditional practices that have persisted unchanged for centuries". In a passage regarding Muslim values, he writes "the Qashqai, and probably other tribes, permit the men to drink alcoholic beverages. In their leisure time some tribal khans also enjoy smoking opium. 'As, similar to poker, is a popular card game among tribespeople".

== Gameplay ==
In 1895, General Albert Houtum-Schindler described the rules as follows:

The game of As is exactly like Poker, but without any flushes or sequences. There are four players, and each player gets five cards, dealt to the right. The dealer puts down a stake. The first player then looks at his cards. If he "goes", he says dîdam (I have seen), and covers the stake or raises it. If he does not wish to play, he says nadîdam, (I have not seen) and throws his cards. He may also "go" without looking at his cards - that is, in poker parlance, "straddle" - and says nadîd dîdam (not seeing, I have seen). The second player, if he wishes to play, must cover the stakes, and can also raise. The third player and the dealer then act in the same way just as in poker, and when the stakes of all players are equal and no one raises any more the cards are turned up and the player holding the best hand wins the stakes.

The hands in the order of their value are as follows:

Seh va juft, i.e., three and a pair; a "full".
Sehta, i.e. threes, aces, kings, etc.
Do juft, i.e., two pairs; aces highest.
Juft, i.e., one pair; aces highest.

When two players have the same pair or pairs, the other cards decide; for instance, a pair of kings, ace, soldier, and lakat.

"Bluffing" is a feature of the game and is called tûp zadan, literally "fire off a gun". A bluff is tûp.

As-Nas cards may also have been used for other games. Murdoch Smith writes that the 'game somewhat resembles Lansquenet', which is a much simpler gambling game.

== Playing As-Nas with standard playing cards ==
A 20-card As-Nas pack can be made by taking the aces, kings, queens, jacks, and 10s from a standard pack of cards. The ideal solution, however, is to obtain four identical packs of cards, and borrow cards from each to have 5 sets of 4 identical cards. This avoids having cards of different ranks with the same suit symbols. For example, 4 × ace of spades, 4 × king of clubs, 4 × queen of hearts, 4 × jack of diamonds, 4 × joker (or pip card). With the 4 packs of cards several such As-Nas packs can be compiled.

== Museums and collections of As-Nas cards ==
- Brooklyn Museum, New York, NY, USA
- Metropolitan Museum of Art, New York, NY, USA
- Museum of Fine Arts, Houston, TX, USA
- German Playing Card Museum, Leinfelden, Germany
- Cary Collection, housed in the Beinecke Library, Yale University (USA).
- Museum of Fournier de Naipes (dedicated to playing cards), Vittoria, Spain
- British Museum
- Bibliothèque nationale de France
- Musée Français de la Carte à Jouer (French playing cards museum), Issy-Les-Moulineaux, near Paris, France
- Moghadam Museum, Tehran, Iran
- Nationaal Museum van Wereldculturen, Leiden, the Netherlands

== See also ==
- Ganjifa
- Maisir (gambling): for the Islamic view on gambling and games of chance
