= Ganjifa =

Persian card game

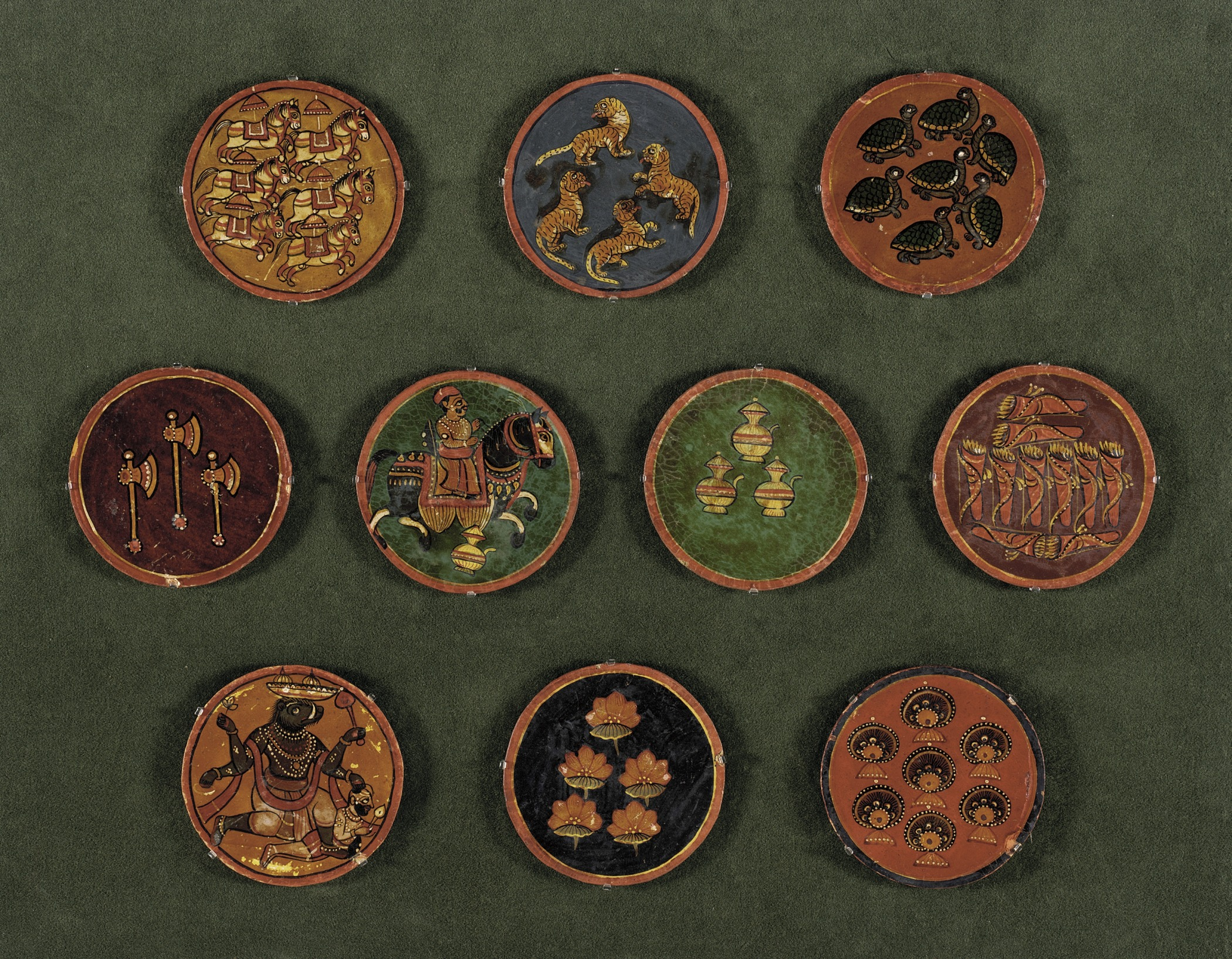
Various Ganjifa cards from Dashavatara set

Ganjifa, Ganjapa or Gânjaphâ, is a card game and type of playing cards that are most associated with Persia and India. After Ganjifa cards fell out of use in Iran before the twentieth century, India became the last country to produce them.

== Description ==
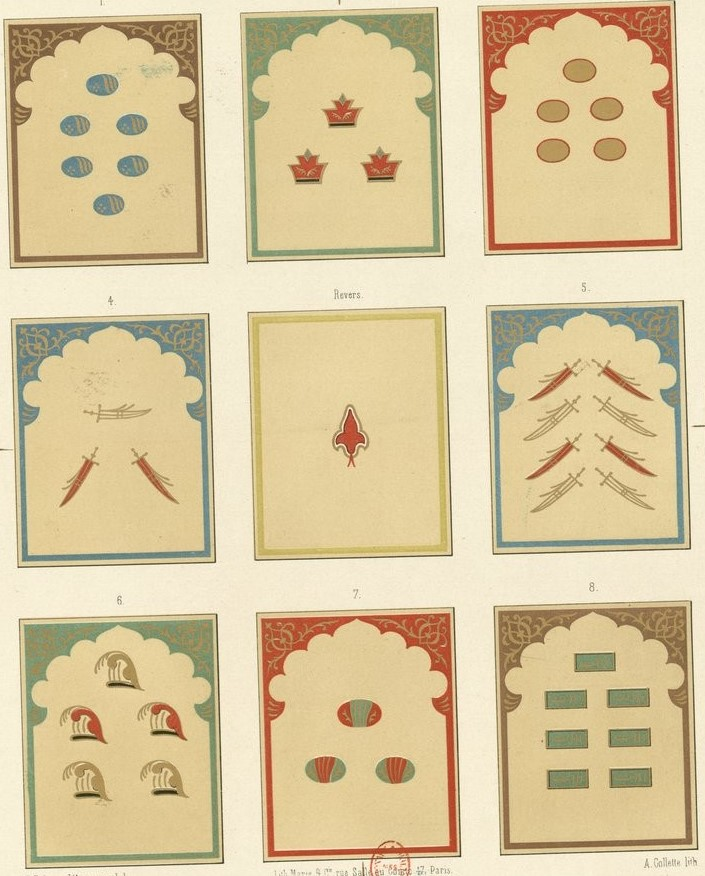
Images of ivory playing cards bought in a Cairo bazaar by French traveller Mr. Émile Prisse d'Avennes (1807-1879), during his visit to Egypt in the period 1827-1844. He identified them as Persian by the style and quality.

Ganjifa cards are circular or rectangular, and traditionally hand-painted by artisans. The game became popular at the Mughal court, and lavish sets were made, from materials such as precious stone-inlaid ivory or tortoise shell (darbar kalam). The game later spread to the general public, whereupon cheaper sets (bazâr kalam) would be made from materials such as wood, palm leaf, stiffened cloth or pasteboard. Typically Ganjifa cards have coloured backgrounds, with each suit having a different colour. Different types exist, and the designs, number of suits, and physical size of the cards can vary considerably. With the exception of Mamluk Kanjifa and the Chads of Mysore, each suit contains ten pip cards and two court cards, the king and the vizier or minister. The backs of the cards are typically a uniform colour, without patterning.

== History ==
=== Etymology ===
The earliest origins of the cards remain uncertain, but Ganjifa cards as they are known today are believed to have originated in Persia. The first syllable is attributed to the Persian word ganj meaning "treasure." Gen. Houtum-Schindler suggested to Stewart Culin that the last two syllables in the word ganjifa may be derived from the Chinese chi-p'ai (= 紙牌 zhǐpái) meaning "playing cards" In a related passage, William Chatto explains that an early Chinese term was ya-pae (= 牙牌 yápái “dominoes”) meaning "bone ticket", and that the term che-pae came later, meaning literally "paper ticket" (1848: 58). These different terms could account for the different spellings and pronunciations of 'Ganjifa'. These remain unproven theories, but the 18th century, traveler Carsten Niebuhr claimed to have seen Arabian merchants in Bombay playing with Chinese cards. In the 19th century Jean Louis Burckhardt visited Mecca and wrote that "cards are played in almost every Arab coffee-house (they use small Chinese cards)".

Ganjifa became popular in India under the Mughal emperors in the 16th century. The term has been used at times in many countries throughout the Middle East and western Asia. In Kuwait, the word janjifah has become a general term and so is applied to the internationally known French deck.

=== Arabic sources and surviving cards ===
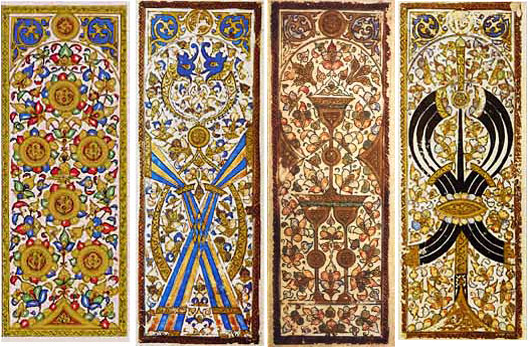
Four Mamluk playing cards

An exhibition in the British museum in 2013 noted "Playing cards are known in Egypt from the twelfth century AD. Ganjafeh was a popular card game in Iran and the Arab world." For example, the word 'kanjifah' ( كنجفة ) is written in the top right corner of the king of swords, on the Mamluk Egyptian deck witnessed by L.A. Mayer in the Topkapı Palace museum. The Mamluk cards are difficult to date with any certainty, but Mayer estimated these cards to be from the 15th century. The piece of playing card collected by Edmund de Unger may be from the period of the 12-14th centuries. The term Kanjifah can be found in the 1839 Calcutta edition of the One Thousand and One Nights, in Arabic, at the end of night 460. The first known reference can be found in a 15th-century Arabic text, written by the Egyptian historian Ibn Taghribirdi (died 1470). In his history of Egypt he mentions how the Sultan Al-Malik Al-Mu'ayyad played kanjafah for money when he was an emir.

The cards used by the Mamluks most likely entered Italy and Spain during the 1370s. As early as 1895, William Henry Wilkinson pointed out the similarities between Spanish and Italian playing cards and Chinese money-suited cards. He was unaware of the existence of the Mamluk cards since Mayer did not make his discovery until 1939. The similarities between the Latin European cards and Chinese money-suited cards become more apparent when the Mamluk Kanjifa is described. Looking at the actual games played with Ganjifa cards, Andrew Leibs points out that the cards are divided into strong and weak suits, and in one set the order of the numerical cards is reversed, so that the order runs King, Vizier, 1, 2, 3, 4, 5, 6, 7, 8, 9, and 10 the weakest. This feature can also be found in the old games of Tarot, Ombre, and Maw played in Europe, and the Chinese money-suited card game of 'Madiao'. He suggests these games may have a common ancestor.

Kanjifa consists of 52 cards divided into four suits:

- Coins: This suit is in reverse order like in Chinese money-suited card games of Madiao and Khanhoo as well as in Tarot, Ombre, and Maw. The high ranking cards of this suit have blue panels (king, viceroy, second viceroy, 1, 2, 3).
- Polo-sticks: Very likely originated from the Chinese suit of Strings of Coins. This suit is also in reverse order as indicated by the blue panels. This suit was converted into cudgels (bastos in Spain) or batons (bastoni Italy) as polo (chovgan) was unknown in Europe.
- Cups: The cups are called tuman, a Turkic, Mongol, and Jurchen word meaning "myriad". In China, there is a suit of myriads (万). Wilkinson proposed that European cups were created by flipping the Chinese character. In Italy and Spain, this suit was inverted but in the Mamluk deck the blue panels are only found in the three court cards.
- Swords: This suit is in the logical order with blue panels on the king, viceroy, second viceroy, 10, 9, and 8. Andrea Pollett proposes that it originates from the Chinese suit of Tens (十) of Myriads.

However, in the “Latin”-suit system, it is the two ‘round’ suits, coins and cups, that have their pips arranged in reverse order, while the two ‘long’ suits follow the ‘natural’ order. This was transferred to French suits, with the two red suits, hearts and diamonds, being reversed, while the black suits, clubs and spades, are not.

Richard Ettinghausen speculated that importation of European cards killed off manufacturers in Egypt and the Levant. Trade continued after the conquest of these regions by the Ottomon Turks in 1517. They were also mentioned by Ibn Hajar al-Haytami. The lack of references or cards after the 16th century is likely due to the Ottomans taking a harder stance against cards and gambling which would last until the 19th century.

=== Persian sources ===
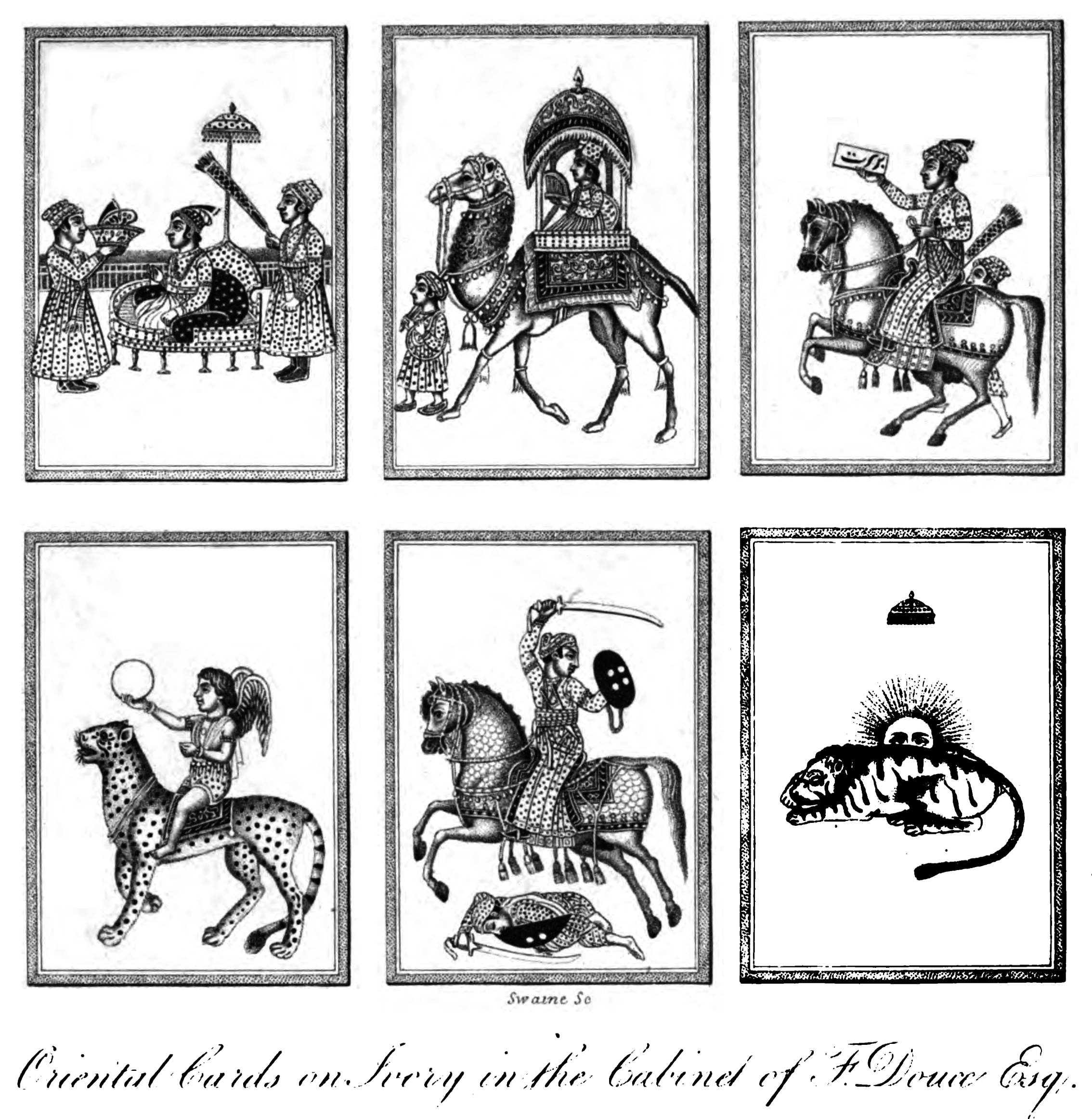
Images of cards from the collection of Francis Douce, shown by Samuel Weller Singer. The figure on horseback on the card in the top right corner appears to be holding an object marked " برات ", meaning 'bill' or 'cheque' in Persian.

The earliest Persian reference is found in Ahli Shirazi's (died 1535) poem, 'Rubaiyat-e-Ganjifa', there is a short verse for each of the 96 cards in the 8-suited pack, showing that the Persians had the same suits and ranks as the Mughals. The Austrian National Library possess eight Safavid lacquer paintings from the 16th-century that mimic ganjifeh cards. Despite being produced around the same time as Shirazi's poem, they do not match his description. Shah Abbas II (r 1642-66) banned ganjifeh and the game decline precipitously with no known rules surviving into the present. Around the eighteenth or nineteenth centuries, the game of As-Nas became more popular. In 1895, General Albert Houtum-Schindler described ganjifeh and As-Nas with the following comments:

"The word ganjifeh is in Persian now only employed for European playing-cards (four suits, ace to ten; three picture cards each suit), which, however, are also called rarak i âs - rarak i âsanâs - or simply âs, from the game âs or âsanâs. From travellers to Persia in the seventeenth century we know that a set of ganjifeh consisted of ninety or ninety-six cards in eight suits or colors.

Michael Dummett noted the differences between Mamluk kanjifa and Safavid ganjifeh and postulated that there was an earlier ancestor. This ur-ganjifeh would be similar to kanjifa but with only two court cards, the king and the viceroy/vizier. The second viceroy rank found in the kanjifa pack is not based on any historical title and may be a Mamluk invention. According to his hypothesis, the Chinese money-suited pack entered Persia where the Persians added three new ranks: the 10, viceroy, and king to make a 48-card pack. He suggests the Persians eventually changed most of the Chinese suits to fit their culture while the Mamluks were more conservative with the suits. The addition of new suits in both Persia and India was to make the game more challenging as memory is the most important skill in the eponymous trick-taking game. Chinese money-suited cards copied their pips directly from Chinese banknotes. In 1294, Gaykhatu began printing an imitation of Yuan banknotes in Iran although these were withdrawn quickly after merchants rejected them. By the 17th century, the money-suited deck had acquired a new card depicting a Persian merchant.

=== Early history in India ===
The earliest playing cards used in India were known as Patrakrida; they predated Ganjifa by several centuries, though no manuals exist today as to how they were used. Rudolf von Leyden suggested that the Ganjifa cards may have been brought by the first Mughals from their ancestral homeland in Inner Asia. A key reference comes from an early 16th-century biography of Bâbur, the founder of the Mughal dynasty. In his work the Baburnama, Babur notes in the year 933H (1527) that he had a pack of Ganjifa cards sent to Shah Hassan. This took place in the month of Ramzan, on the night he left Agra to travel to nearby Fatehpur Sikri (Uttar Pradesh, India). The earliest surviving rules date to around 1600 in India. When Edward Terry visited India in the first quarter of the seventeenth century, he saw ganjifa cards often. Modern ganjifa is usually round but rectangular cards were more common during the 18th-century and from records Persian ganjifeh was always rectangular. Its circular shape must have been an Indian innovation.

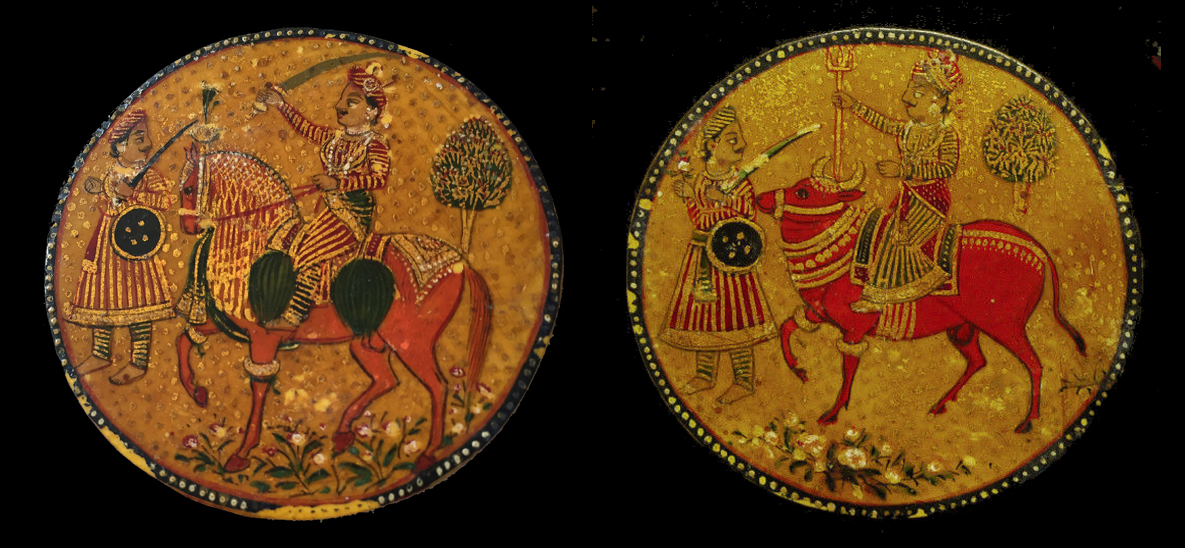
Mughal Ganjifa Playing Cards, Early 19th century, courtesy of the Wovensouls collection

While Mughal ganjifa had the same suits and ranks as Safavid ganjifeh, a 10-suited deck, the Dashavatara Ganjifa, was created to appeal to Hindus in the seventeenth century. Some historical decks have had more than 30 suits.

=== Competition from Western style cards ===
In countries such as India and Persia, the traditional hand-made Ganjifa cards lost market share to Western-style printed cards, which came to dominate in the 20th century. This decline has several aspects.

- Improvements in printing techniques and machinery allowed manufacturers in Europe and elsewhere to improve their output and further expand their export of playing cards. Manufacturers introduced steam powered machines, lithography and later Offset printing during the 19th century. For example, the town of Turnhout in Belgium was a centre of playing cards manufacture. The Turnhout manufacturer Brepols installed steam powered equipment in 1852, lithographic printing of playing cards in 1862, and began offset printing in 1920. In the period around 1900 the French manufacturer Camoin exported cards to North Africa, and the Middle East as far as the Persian Gulf. The Indian market was so significant for the Belgian manufacturer 'Biermans' that a factory was established in Calcutta in 1934. In 1938 playing card exports from the US to India totalled some 888,603 packs, and 60,344 packs were exported to Iraq. For the Ottoman Empire some European manufacturers produced cards with specific designs, known as 'cartes turques' and 'cartes orientales'. These were essentially 4-suited European style designs, but the aces featured scenic prints adapted to the target market.
- Ganjifa cards were less suited to Western card games. The invention of games such as Euchre, Bridge, Poker, and Rummy can be seen as significant events and Western style playing cards are best suited to these games. In Iran, the game of As-Nas largely fell out of fashion by around 1945. In some countries such as Saudi Arabia and Kuwait, a version of the French game Belote became popular, under the name Baloot ( بلوت ). With regards to India, European style cards were introduced during the colonial period, with demand coming from the wealthier classes. Some cards were imported, some were made by hand using traditional techniques, and others were made by Indian industrialists. The Cary Collection of Playing Cards (Yale University) has a deck of Indian-made bridge cards dated to around 1935, for example.
- Taxes on playing cards. States used taxes on playing cards to generate revenue, and required specific stamps or wrappers on packs of cards. Such arrangements can create barriers for smaller manufacturers producing cards by hand. The Ottoman Empire introduced taxes on playing cards in 1904.
- Playing cards monopolies. In many countries state monopolies were established to control imports and production. Such monopolies tend to standardise card designs, or create conditions that better suit larger manufacturers that can win government contracts or meet the necessary conditions. In Iran, the monopoly was set up following the Foreign Trade Monopoly Act of 1931. The British playing card manufacturer De La Rue was commissioned to provide cards during the 1930s. The cards featured indexing in Persian and court card images that evoked Persian history. Nonetheless the cards used Western style suits, and so the commissioning of the cards reinforced the position of Western-style 4-suited printed cards.

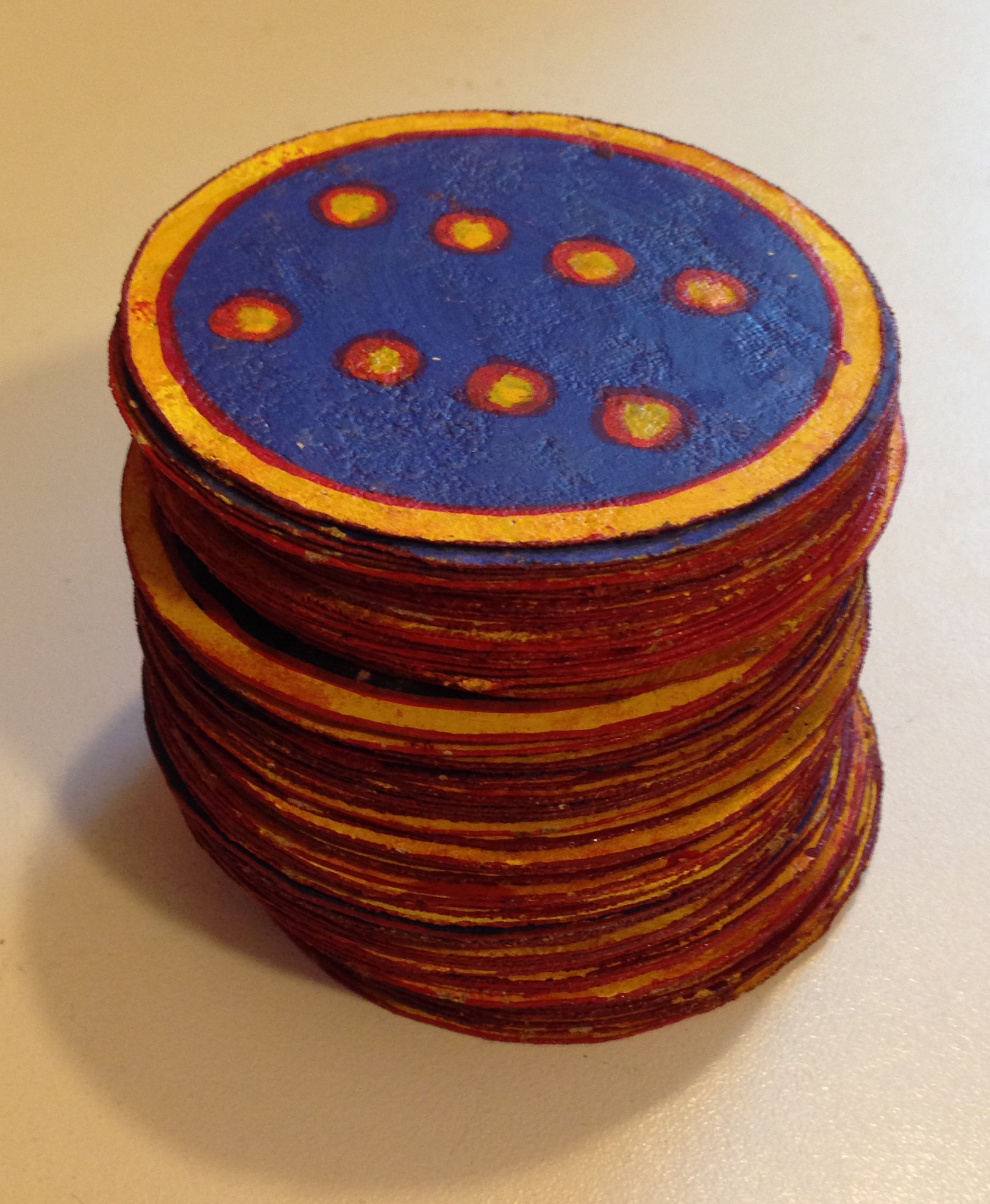
Playing cards from Puri, Odisha, India, made with the traditional pattachitra technique.

By the 21st-century, the only place with a significant community of ganjifa makers and players is Odisha in the east of India, Mysore in Karnataka, Nirmal in Telangana, Sawantwadi in Maharashtra, Rajasthan, Kashmir, Bishnupur in West Bengal and Sheopur in Madhya Pradesh. In Odisha, they use ganjapa, the local variation known for abstract and highly stylized suit symbols and extra suits.

== Variants ==
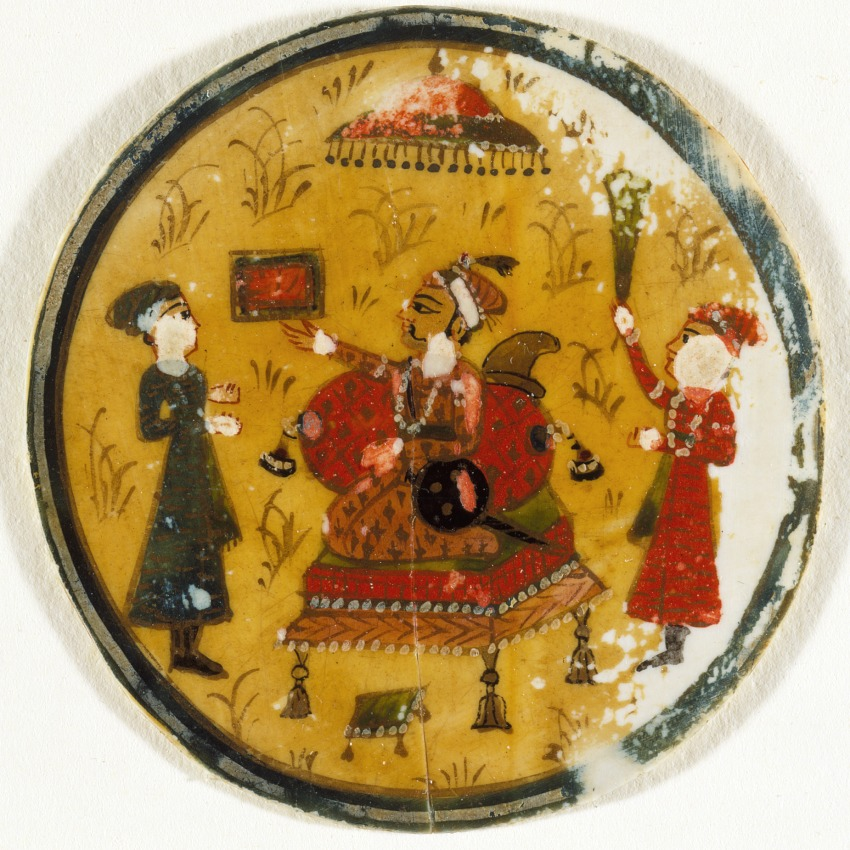
King of Barāt from Moghul Ganjifa set

- Moghul Ganjifa is played in some parts of Odisha with 96 cards in 8 suits of 12 cards each; each suit is distinctively coloured and comprises ten pip cards from 1 to 10 and two court cards, a vizier and a king. This is the type of pack described by Ahli Shirazi. The suits featured are: slaves (ḡolām, غلام ); crowns (tāj, تاج ) swords (šamšīr, شمشير ); 'red' gold coins (zar-e sorḵ, زر سرخ ); harps (čang, چنگ ); bills of exchange (barāt, برات ); white gold coins (zar-e safīd, زر سفيد ); and cloth (qomāš قماش ). When referring to the king of a suit, he uses the term 'emir', shortened to 'mir' ( میر ) in the titles, but the term 'padishah' ( پادشاه ) in the text of the verses. He describes a card with one suit symbol simply as a 'one', that is to say he does not use the term 'ace'. The white gold coins, crown, swords, and slaves suits have ranks ascending from one to ten, and the rest have ranks descending from ten to one.

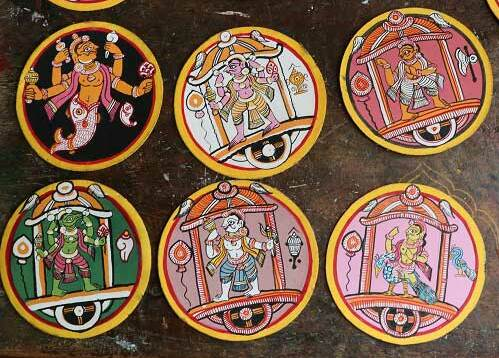
Various cards from Dashavatara Ganjapa set

- Dashavatara Ganjifa is played by three persons with 120 cards, mainly in Sawantwadi in Maharashtra, India, although it is played by five persons in Bishnupur, West Bengal. It is the most popular set played throughout India. There are 10 suits of 12 cards each; the suits correspond to the ten avatars of Vishnu: Matsya, Kuchha, Varaha, Narsingha, Vamana, Parashurama, Rama, Balaram/Krishna, Jagannath/Buddha, and Kalanki. Depending on demand, this set may be extended up to 24 suits to encompass more major deities like Brahma, Shiva, Ganesha, Kartikeya, Surya, Chandra, etc.
- Ramayan Ganjifa, a type with imagery from the Hindu epic, the Ramayan. It is closely associated with the Ganjapa tradition of Odisha and usually has eight, ten, or twelve suits. Each suit is dedicated to a character: Rama and his five allies against Ravana and his five demons. The suits could also be story-based and depict different episodes from the epic.
- Rashi Ganjifa from Sawantwadi, Maharashtra is a 12 suited Indian deck, with suit symbols derived from the 12 signs of the zodiac. It appears to be limited to the 18th and 19th centuries.
- Ashta Malla Ganjifa, meaning 'Eight Wrestlers'. Depicts Krishna wrestling various demons. from Chikiti, Odisha
- Naqsh Ganjifa For playing Naqsh, shorter Indian decks exist, with 48 cards. There is only one suit which is quadruplicated. The suit symbols used for the run of 12 cards vary from one pack to the next. These decks are associated with gambling or play during the festival season in India.
- Mysore Chad Ganjifa. Mysore was a centre for Ganjifa card making, encouraged by the ruler Krishnaraja Wadiyar III in the mid-19th century. He devised a series of complex Ganjifa games, some requiring as many as 18 different suits, permanent trumps, and wild cards. A typical Chad suit had twelve numeral and six court cards (Raja on elephant or throne, Rajni in a palanquin, Amatya or Mantri in a ratha, Senani (general) on horseback, Padathi or Sevaka (foot-soldier or servant), and Dhwaja (flag or banner)), and packs had as many as 360 cards. They never achieved mass appeal and are quite obscure, possibly played only within his royal palace if at all. The games are described in the work called the Sritattvanidhi, in the section 'Kautuka nidhi', and colour illustrations show designs for the cards.
- Akbar's Ganjifa. The 16th-century Mughal emperor Akbar played using a 12 suited deck, which is described in detail in the Ain-i-Akbari. The suits were horses, elephants, foot soldiers, forts, treasures, warriors in armour, boats, women, divinities, genii, wild beasts, and snakes. No specimens are known to have survived.

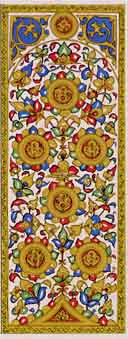
Seven of Coins in Mamluk Kanjifa set

- Mamluk Kanjifa. Very few such cards are known or exist. The examples found by Leo Aryeh Mayer are understood to have four suits: cups, coins, swords, and polo-sticks. Each suit has three court cards, the king (malik), the first vizir (na'ib malik), and the second vizir (na'ib thani). The court cards have no figurative imagery, but they feature calligraphed inscriptions and richly decorated backgrounds. The term 'Kanjifa' appears in Arabic on the king of swords. They directly inspired the Latin-suited playing cards of Italy and Spain.

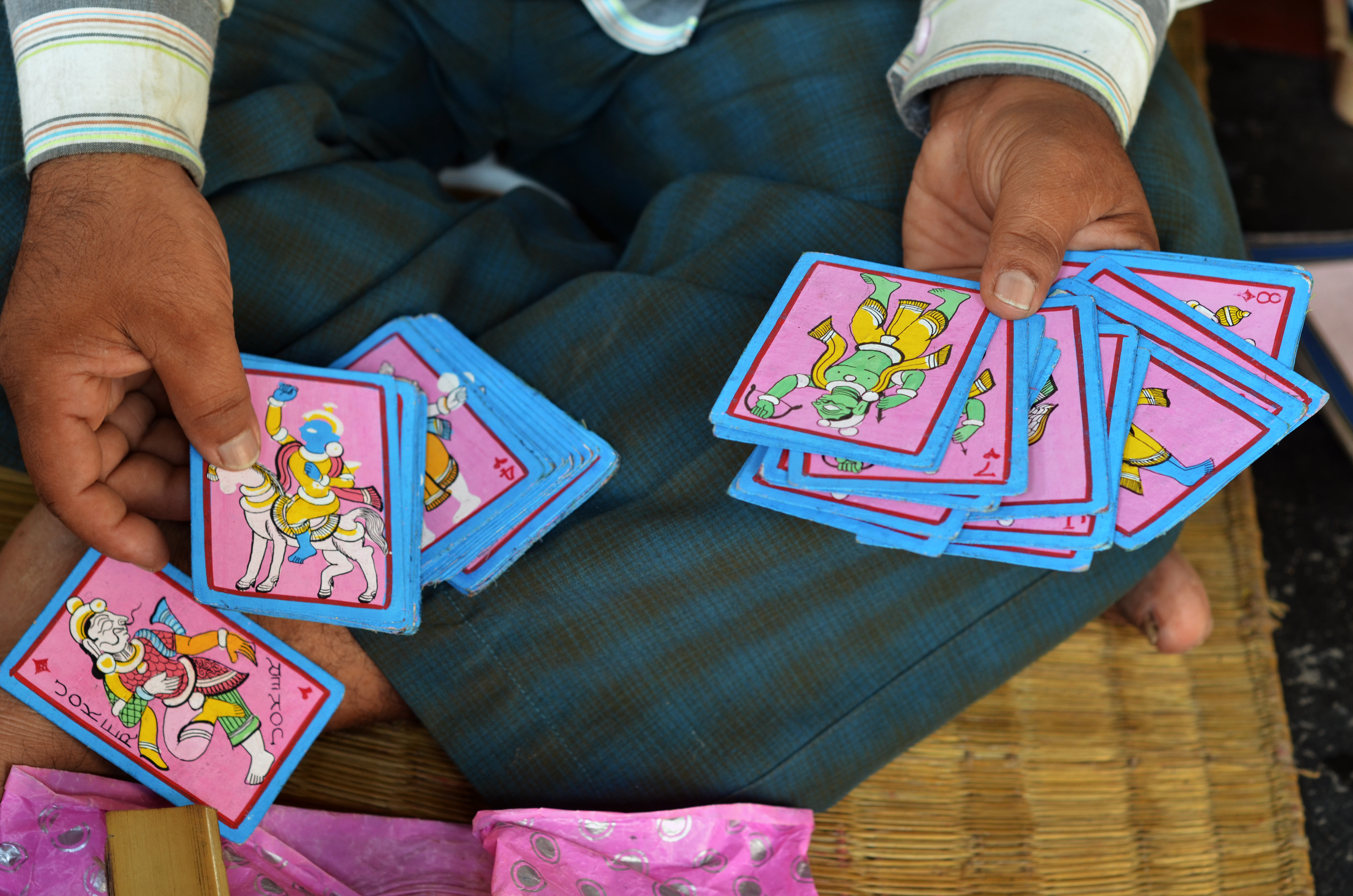
French suited Ganjapa set

- French suited Ganjifa. Hybrids exist that combine Indian or Persian imagery with the hearts, diamonds, spades, and clubs symbols of the French suit system.

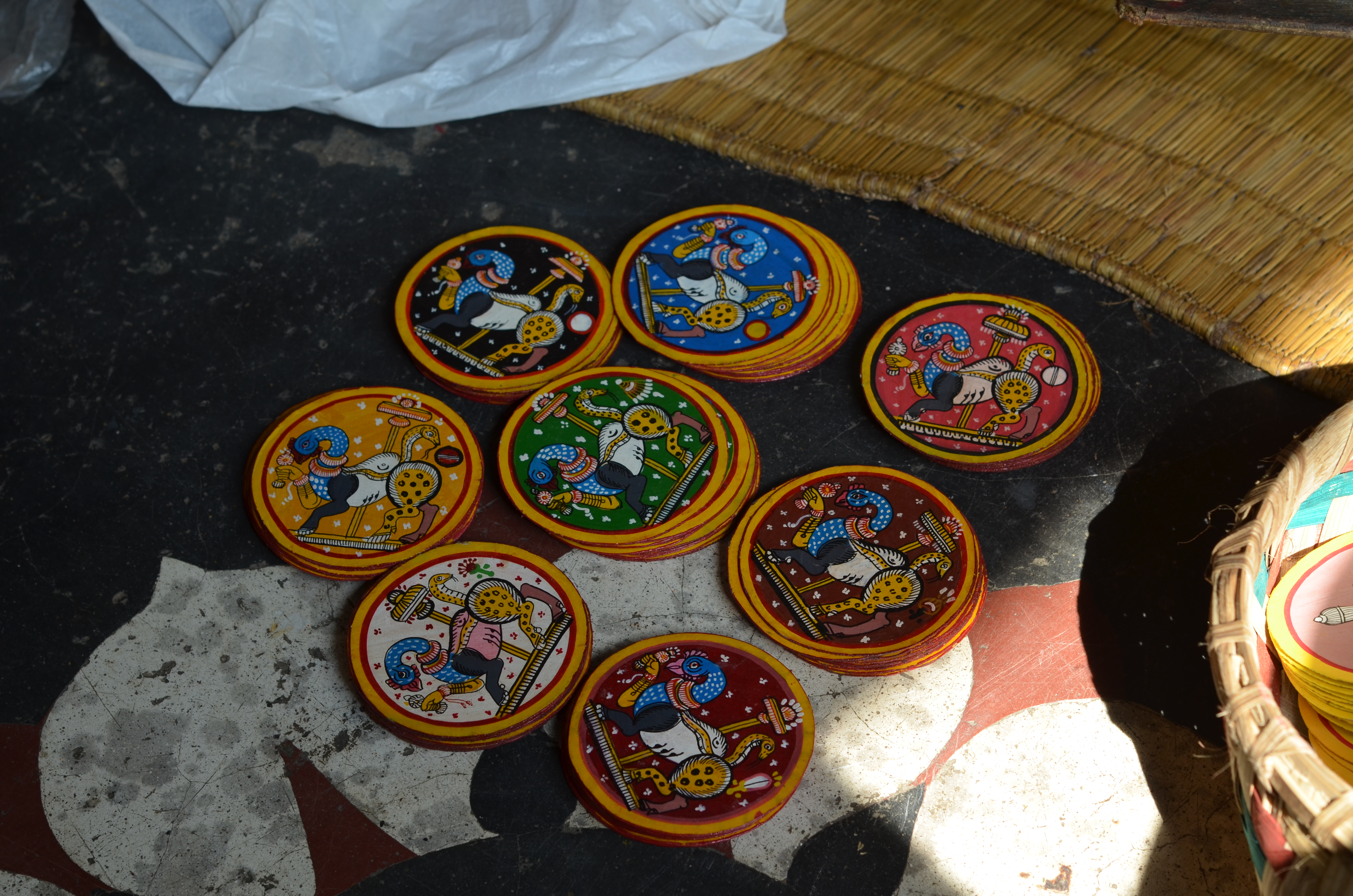
Atharangi (8 color) Nabagunjara Ganjapa set

- Nabagunjara Ganjifa is typical only to the Puri region, has 8 suits differentiated only by color ("Atharangi" 8-color cards), and features Krishna (depicted as a Nabagunjara) on the king rank, and Arjuna on the vizier rank.
- Ashtadikpala (eight cardinal deities) from Chikiti, Odisha
- Ratha-Hati/Ghoda (Kings with chariots and ministers on elephant or horse) from Chikiti, Odisha
- Navagraha Ganjifa from Sawantwadi, Maharashtra. There are nine suits each depicting the Hindu mythological planets: Surya-Ravi (Sun), Chandra (Moon), Mangala-Kuja (Mars), Budhan-Buddha (Mercury), Guru-Brihaspati (Jupiter), Sukrana-Sukra (Venus), Sani-Shani (Saturn), Rahu (Dragon's head), and Ketu (Dragon's tail).
- Santh Ganjifa (based on the Marathi saints) from Sawantwadi, Maharashtra

== Games ==
=== Ganjifa ===
This is a trick-taking game, played individually. This is the game most commonly associated with ganjifa cards, each player playing for themself. The objective is to win the most cards by taking tricks. At least three players are required. In some games 4 players play individually, and it is also possible to play in pairs. The rules vary, but generally the following apply:

In the simplest form of the game there is no concept of a 'trump suit' that beats cards in other suits. A trick can only be won by a card of the same suit. When a player is not in position to win a trick there is no obligation to follow the suit led.

In all cases the King ('mir' or 'shah') is always the strongest card in each suit, followed by the Vizier. However, in half the suits the numerical cards rank in logical order from 10 strongest (just below the Vizier), down to 1 (weakest), and the other suits the order of the numerical cards is reversed, with the ace strongest (just below the Vizier), and the 10 weakest, thus giving the order K,V,1,2,3,4,5,6,7,8,9,10. If playing with a Moghul type pack, the suits with the 'reverse order' numerical cards are barat, zar-e zorkh, qomash, and chang (bills, red gold coins, cloth, and harps) in India; in Iran, zar-e safīd (white coins) were inverted instead of the red coins. In Dashavtar packs the suits with reversed cards are the first avatars, Matsya, Kutchha, Varaha, Nrusinha and Waman (fish, turtle, boar, lion and round vessel symbols).

Before the start of play stakes are agreed if the game is being played for money. At the end of the round the losing player pays this stake value, multiplied by the difference in number of tricks taken between the winner and the loser.

==== Dealing ====
Players draw cards at the beginning to determine who will deal. Traditionally players would sit on a sheet or large cloth on the floor, and the cards are mixed face down in the middle of the cloth, rather than shuffled in the manner of Western cards.

The deal and the order of the play follows an anti-clockwise direction. The dealer deals out all the cards. According to custom cards may be dealt in batches of four, rather than individually. Some accounts stipulate that the first batch and last batch dealt to each player are dealt face up.

Players should sort their cards into suits and put them in order. For convenience, due to the large number of cards, players often separate any low value pip cards and keep them to the side, keeping only the more valuable cards in hand. When discarding during play these low value cards are used indifferently.

==== Play ====
During the game players must try to keep track of the cards that have been played. The highest outstanding cards left in play in each suit are called 'hukm', corresponding to the Persian word " حکم ".

The player to lead is the one holding the King in a certain suit. This 'lead suit' varies according to the type of pack, and also according to whether the game is played during the day (between sunrise and sunset) or during the night. With a Moghul pack the lead suits are zar-e zorkh (red gold coins, or figuratively 'suns') by day, and zar-e safid (white gold coins or figuratively 'moons') by night. If playing with Dashavtar cards the lead suits are Rama by day, and Krishna by night. The player holding the King in this lead suit begins by playing two cards at once - the King and another low card. The other players cannot win, and so they each discard two low cards which are won by the player who led the game. This player then leads again. At this point accounts of the game rules differ. The rules below are based on the description by John McLeod.

Rules govern which leads are possible. Players must lead as follows, in order of priority:
1- If the lead player has a continuous series of winning cards in a suit, then this sequence must be led, with the exception of the last card in the sequence which is kept for later.
2- The next possibility is a move called 'deni'. This is possible when a player lacks the hukm in a given suit, but has the second highest outstanding card. In this case the player may lead a low card in that suit, and call for the hukm. The opponent with the hukm then wins the trick but the player that made the 'deni' move retains the lead, which is the advantage of making this move. If the player with the hukm also holds the third highest card in the suit, he may play this card as well, and it is said that the deni is doubled. In this case everyone plays a second card and the player with the hukm wins two tricks. However the lead still returns to the player who made the deni move.
3- When a leader cannot make either of the two leads described above, he then leads out any remaining hukm cards, all at once, a move called 'utari'. In McLeod's account this is the only option available to a player at this stage, so a player would need to lead any hukms they might have, and then pass the lead as described next in step 4. However in the rules given by Wilkins there is a second option, whereby the player can instead simply lead a low card or non-winning card of his choosing to pass the lead.
4- If a player has no further valid options for leading cards, he gives up the lead by shuffling his hand, and placing the cards face down. The player to his right then selects the card that he must lead, for example by saying 'fourth from the top' or pointing to a card if they are spread out. The lead then passes to the player who wins the trick, who then follows the same sequence of possible leads as described above.

In some accounts there is an end phase or secondary phase to the game, in which the leading rules are simplified or changed. According to McLeod, when the players get down to the last 12 cards, steps 1 and 2 described above are skipped, and a player starts by leading out all his hukms directly. After doing so, the player must try to lead a card from a suit named by his right-hand neighbour. If he cannot lead this suit the lead is passed as described in step 4 above, with the player's cards shuffled and placed face down. In Wilkins' account, there is also a second phase to the game, which applies when all the players have held and lost the lead once. From this point onwards hukm cards are played individually instead of in batches. Furthermore, in this second phase, if a player leads a low card, it is played face down and the player can freely choose the suit which must be followed.

The round continues until all the cards have been played. At this point the players can count their tricks and decide any payments or forfeits that must be paid. However in the rules described by Chatto there a final round played using the cards won in tricks. This is a challenging game called 'Ser-k'hel'. Players shuffle their tricks, and the winner of the last trick plays one trick blind against a player of his choice. The winner of this trick then challenges the player to his right in the same way.

==== Following rounds ====
In some accounts losing players are disadvantaged when starting the next round. One possibility is that players are required to use the cards won in tricks for playing with in the following round. Players who are short on cards have to buy cards from other players to make up the difference. Alternatively, cards can be shuffled and distributed equally, but losing players are required to exchange cards with winning players. The losing player must give cards at random, without looking at them, and the winning player is allowed to return low value cards, sorted from his hand. The number of cards exchanged is the difference in the number of tricks won in the last round.

The total number of rounds played may vary. In Chatto's account a full game is made up of four rounds. In the version described by Maudranalay, there is no fixed number of rounds, rather the game must continue round after round until a losing player (presumably meaning a player who lost the previous round) beats the card led by another player on the last trick of the round. This last lead card is called the 'akheri', from a word for 'last' (which exists in persian and Arabic ( آخر ). In Wilkin's account, this event has a different significance. Wilkins writes that if a player beats the akheri card, he is exempted from paying any forfeit money going into the next round.

An adaptation is possible if players use the international 52 card pack. In this case the game is for three players only, and the 2 of diamonds is removed so that players each receive 17 cards each. The lead suit is always spades. In an account of the game in northern India (before the creation of Pakistan), Shurreef writes that the King is referred to as 'Badshah' (corresponding to the Persian term 'Padishah'), the queen as 'Bibia' (Persian term 'Bibi'), and the Jack as the 'Ghulam', meaning 'slave'.

=== Partnership Ganjifa ===
Played in partnerships (two against two). Some call this game 'Dugi'. In this game the order of the suits and the cards is the same as for the individual ganjifa trick taking game described above, however the aim of the game is for one partnership to win all the tricks. The partnership dealt the King in the lead suit has to take on this challenge. It is possible to determine the lead suit by the day or night rule as above, or by cutting cards. The following game rules are taken from an account by John McLeod

The partners taking on the challenge to win all the tricks can decide between themselves who will take on the lead. Before starting, the lead king can be passed from one partner to another in exchange for another card of the same suit.

When leading, a player must lead all the 'hukms' that they have in hand (these are the highest cards remaining in a given suit, that are sure to win). Players must follow suit if they are able to do so. If this is not possible, the leading player names another suit, and they must discard their highest card in that suit. If they do not have any cards in the suit named, then they may discard any other card.

When a player who has the lead has no hukms, he may ask his partner which suit he should lead. Thus the partner can indicate a suit in which he has a hukm, so that the partnership can keep the lead. If the partner names a suit that the leader does not have in hand, the leader must decide himself which card to lead, without asking for more guidance.

If the opponents succeed in winning a single trick then they win the game.

=== Naqsh ===
This game can be played with any pack of cards, including the Mughal types, and the shorter 48 card decks. European style packs can be used by removing the jacks. Each suit therefore has two court cards, and ten numeral cards. The game has some similarities with Blackjack. In Naqsh the 'Mir' (or King) is given a value of 12 points, and the second court card, the 'Ghodi' (or Vizir, Cavalier or Queen) is worth 11. The other cards are worth their pip values, including the ace which has a value of 1. Several players can play the game. Mr. Gordhandas suggests 5-7 players, with 6 being the ideal number. The aim is to achieve a total value of 17 with the first two cards dealt, or the nearest number below this total. Players with low value cards can continue to draw further cards to try to improve their total. Variations can be played where 21 is a target total (but only if made with a King and a 9, or a Vizier and a ten), or where different winning combinations are accepted such as pairs, triples and so on. The game is suited to gambling.

== Notable Ganjifa card collections and collectors ==
- The German Playing Card Museum (Deutsches Spielkartenmuseum), Leinfelden, Germany.
- The Cary collection, housed in the Beinecke Library, Yale University (USA).
- The Indira Gandhi National Centre for the Arts (India), which has a substantial online display of many different Ganjifa cards (http://www.ignca.nic.in).
- The Victoria and Albert Museum in London has at least six sets of Ganjifa cards in its collection. Two sets are from the 19th century (museum nos.: IM.78:1, 2-1938 and 01316&A/(IS)), three sets are from the late 20th century (museum nos.: IS.66:121-1981 and IS.472:60-1993 and IS.46A-1963), and there are cards from a Naqsh set from the late 19th or early 20th century (museum no.:IS.76-1979).
- The British Museum houses rectangular and circular ganjifa cards from Persia and India, going back to the 18th century and some images are made available online (website: British Museum)
- The Los Angeles County Museum of Art (LACMA) has a small collection with some fine examples.
- The Bodleian Library, Oxford University, has a small collection, including cards collected by Francis Douce. The Oriental section has two sets from the 19th century (MS.Sansk d.337(R) and MS.Sansk.g.4).
- Powis Castle in Wales has 88 cards from the collection of Robert Clive. The cards are circular, made in ivory with gild edges, and relatively large in size (80mm). Link to images retrieved 1/2/2015:
- The Topkapı Palace museum in Istanbul is significant for housing one set of centuries old Mamluk playing cards.
- In India some fine examples can also be found in the National Museum of New Delhi, and the Allahabad Museum. To view examples search "Ganjifa" using National Portal and Digital Repository
- Jaganmohan Palace of Mysore, India
- Museum in a place called Ganjam in Srirangapattana has huge collection of Ganjifa. Mr Raghupathi Bhat also known as Ganjifa bhat has adopted this art and contributed to enhance the collections of Ganjifa art
- Anshul Kaushik, also known as History Hunter has a set of 68 Mughal cards in his collection. The cards are kept in a beautiful hand made painted wooden box from 1800 AD.
- Dr. Bhau Daji Lad Museum, for a set of Dashavatar ganjifa cards
- Pitt Rivers Museum, Oxford University (UK), for a set of Dashavatar cards that came into the collection in the late 19th century.
- Manjusha Museum, India
- Two sets of ganjifa cards are in the collection of Rev. George Lewis, housed in the cabinet that was sent to the Cambridge University Library in 1727. The cards are made with wafers of wood and tortoiseshell. Lewis was a chaplain in India between 1692 and 1714.
- A complete set of Mughal Ganjifa is a part of the Wovensouls collection .

== See also ==
- Ganjapa
- As-Nas
- Court piece
- Chinese playing cards
- Italian playing cards
- Spanish playing cards
- Gambling and for the Islamic view on gambling and games of chance the article Maisir

== Literature ==
- Chopra, Sarla; Ganjifa : the playing cards of India in Bharat Kala Bhavan; Varanasi, India 1999
- Deodhar, A. B.; Illustrated Marathi Games; Bombay 1905
- Leyden, Rudolf von; Chad: The Playing Cards of Mysore (India); Vienna 1973
- Leyden, Rudolf von; The Playing Cards of South India; in: The Illustrated Weekly of India, 3. Okt. 1954
- Leyden, Rudolf von; The Indian Playing Cards of Francis Douce and the Ganjifa Folios in the Richard Johnson Collection; in: Bodleian Library Record, Oxford 1981, 10,5, p. 297-304
- Leyden, Rudolf von; Ganjifa - the playing cards of India … Victoria & Albert Museum collection; London 1982 (V&A Museum) [Exhibition catalogue]
- Leyden, Rudolf von; A Note on Certain Suit Signs in Indian Playing Cards; in: JCPS, 1974, vol. III/3 p. 33-36.
