= Face card =

Playing card depicting a person

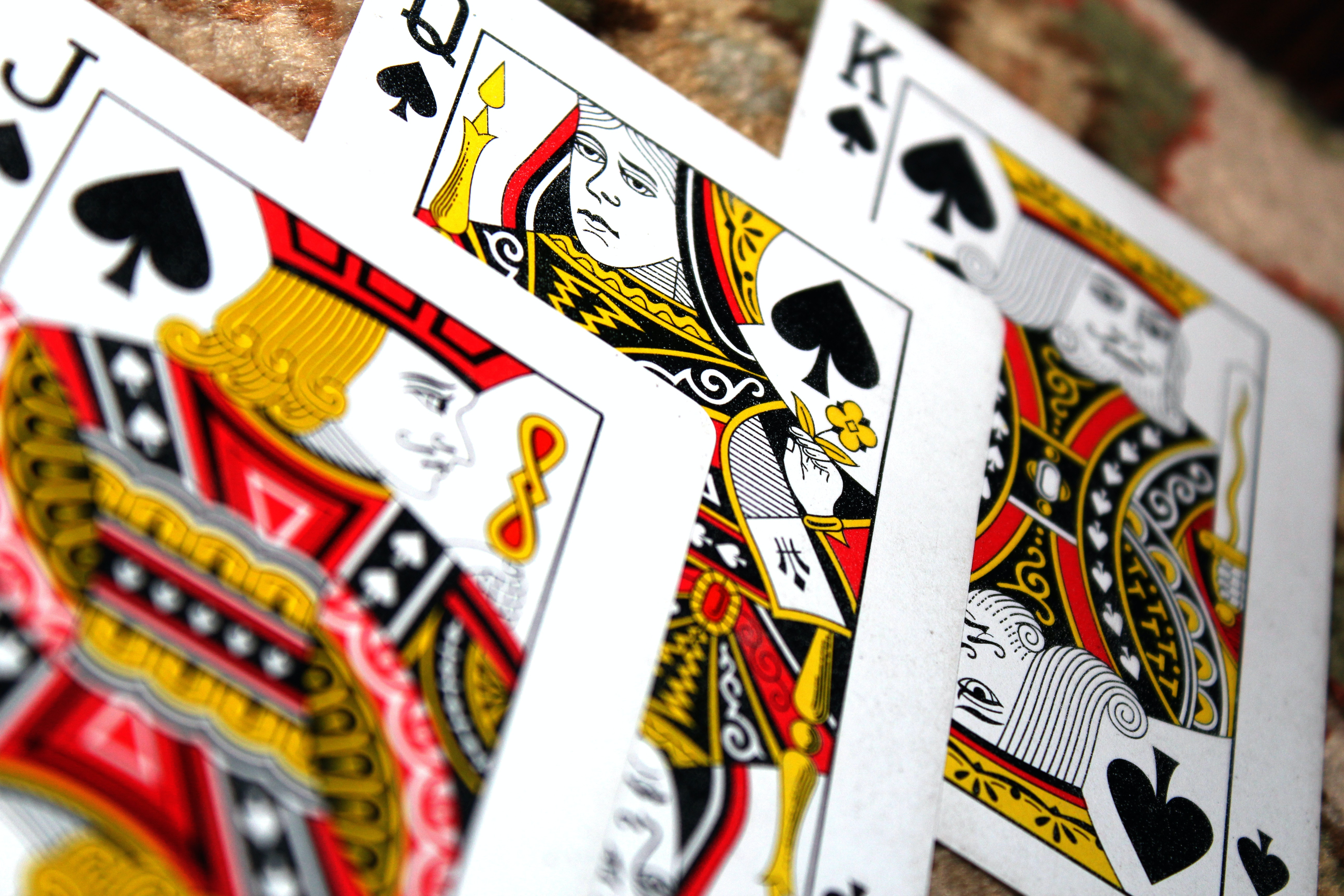
The jack, queen and king of spades: three court cards (face cards) from an English pattern pack

In a deck of playing cards, the term face card (US) or court card (British and US), and sometimes royalty, is generally used to describe a card that depicts a person as opposed to the pip cards. In a standard 52-card pack of the English pattern, these cards are the King, Queen and Jack. The term picture card is also common, but that term sometimes includes the Aces. After the American innovation of corner-indices, the idea of "pictured" cards from tarot trumps was used to replace all 52 cards from the standard deck with pictures, art, or photography in some souvenir packs featuring a wide variety of subjects (animals, scenery, cartoons, pin-ups, vehicles, etc.) that may garner interest with collectors.

In the standard packs of non-English speaking regions, the face or court cards may be different. For example, in Italian- and Spanish-suited packs there is a Knight or Cavalier instead of a Queen. In French-suited Tarot card packs, the Cavalier is a fourth court card. By contrast, German-suited packs typically depict an officer or overlord, known as the Ober, and a sergeant or peasant known as the Unter.

Until the early 20th century, the term coat card was also common.

== History ==
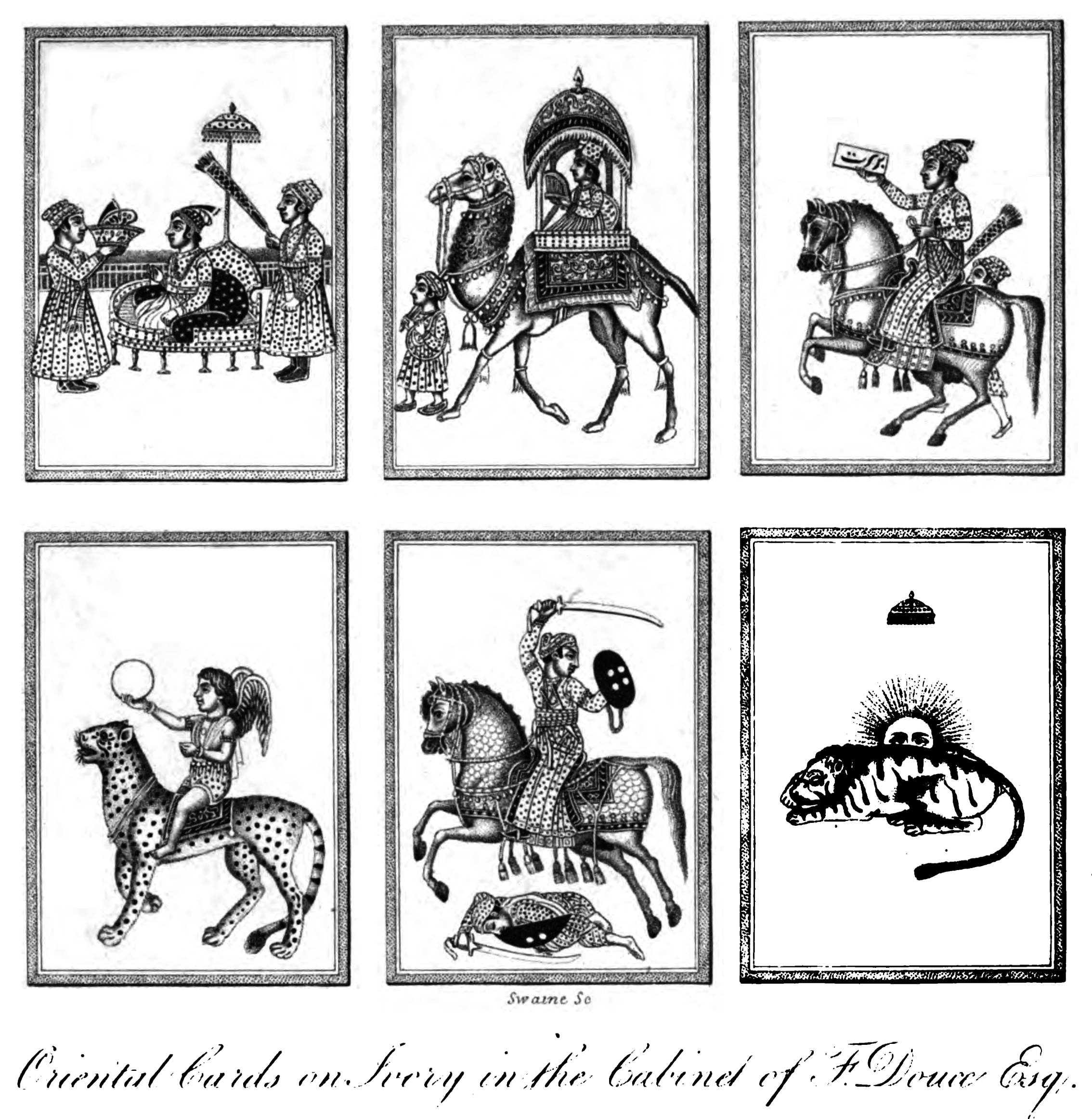
Persian Ganjifeh courts with an ace

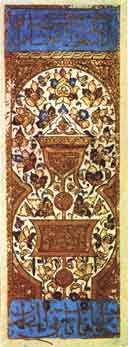
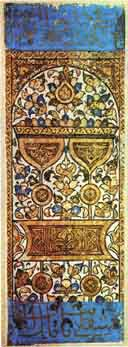
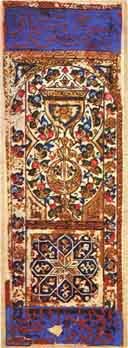
Mamluk Kanjifah courts of cups

While playing cards were invented in China, Chinese playing cards do not have a concept of court cards, though two entire suits featured faces for a period of time when Water Margin cards were popular. When playing cards arrived in Iran, the Persians created the first face cards. The best preserved deck is located in the Topkapı Palace. To avoid idolatry, the cards did not depict human faces and instead featured abstract designs or calligraphy for the malik (king), nā'ib malik (viceroy or deputy king) and thānī nā'ib (second or under-deputy). It is possible that the Topkapı deck, a custom made luxury item used for display, does not represent the cards played by commoners. There are fragments of what may be Mamluk court cards from cheaper decks showing human figures which may explain why seated kings and mounted men appear in both Indo-Persian and European cards. Both Mamluk and modern European decks include three face cards per suit, or twelve face cards in a deck of four suits.

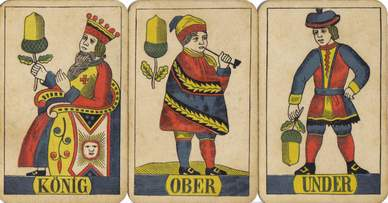
King, Ober, and Under of Acorns from a Swiss deck (1880)

The third court card may have had a special role to play since the Spanish, French, and Italians called the newly introduced cards naipe, nahipi, and naibi respectively as opposed to their Arabic name of Kanjifah. In a 1377 description of cards by John of Rheinfelden, the most common decks were structurally the same as the modern 52-card deck. Each suit contained a seated king and two marshals, one holding the suit symbol upwards while the other downwards. The marshals correspond to the Ober and Unter ranks in modern-day German and Swiss playing cards. As marshals were cavalry commanders, both ranks may have been mounted unlike their modern counterparts. Less popular decks included ones in which two kings were replaced with queens, all the kings replaced by queens, queens and maids added so as to make 15 cards per suit, and 5 or 6 suited decks with only the kings and two marshal ranks.

In Italy and Spain, the Unter and Ober were replaced by the standing Knave and the mounted Knight before 1390, perhaps to make them more visually distinguishable. The Spanish rank of Sota means "under". In 15th-century France, the knight was dropped in favour of the queen. The 15th-century Italian game of trionfi, which later became known as tarot, also added queens and various subjects that would triumph over the other cards for the trick-taking games they were used for. These subjects would later become their own dedicated trump suit, and not considered as court cards though some of them do depict faces. The Cary-Yale deck had the most court cards with six ranks: king, queen, knight, mounted lady, knave, and damsel or maid for a total of 24. It is unlikely that the Cary-Yale deck was designed for a game in mind as it was an expensive wedding gift and was probably never played. Standing kings are a Spanish innovation which was copied by the French.

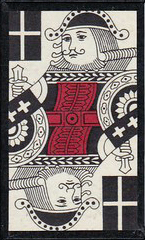
Modern Kabufuda Jack

In the 1540s, Portuguese traders brought their Spanish-influenced playing cards to Japan. In 1633, however, the Tokugawa shogunate banned these cards as part of their Sakoku policy. To get around the ban, Japanese manufacturers radically redesigned their "karuta" (cards) and renamed them to "fuda". The face cards became increasingly abstract and near indistinguishable since face cards have no value in games in the "kabu" family. Eventually, two face card ranks were dropped and only the Jacks were kept for the resulting kabufuda deck. Modern kabufuda is able to utilize a double-headed design influenced by western cards since the ban is no longer in effect.

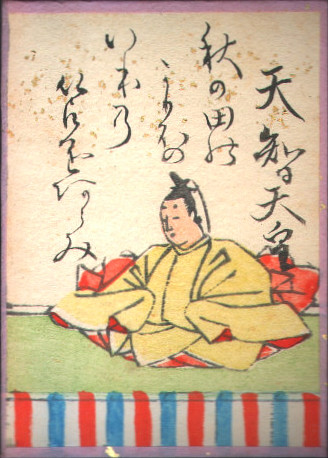
Emperor Tenji on a yomifuda

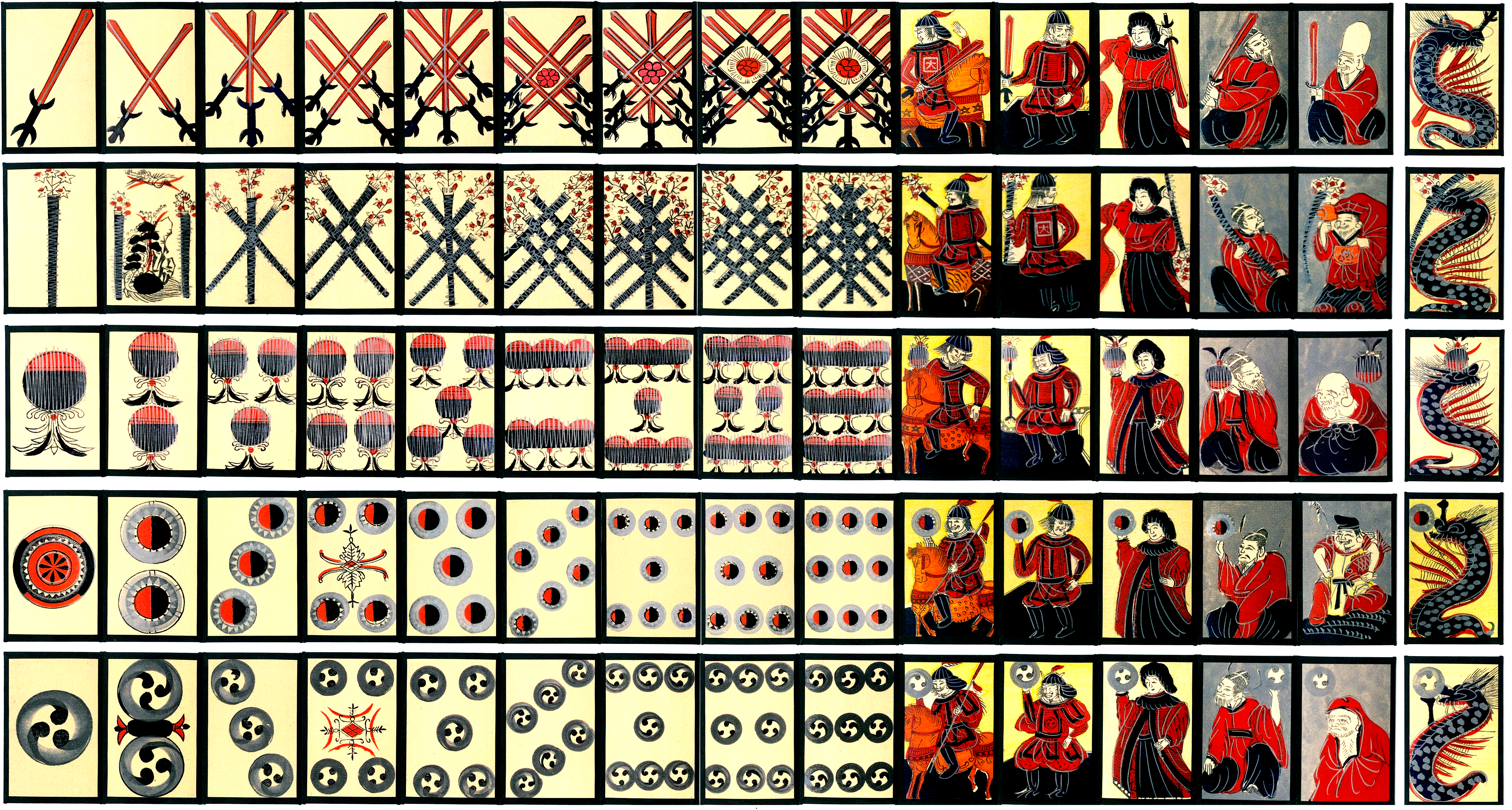
Unsun karuta face cards.

There are two Japanese playing card decks that did not face the same restrictions as kabufuda: Uta-garuta and Unsun karuta. Uta-garuta was found to be of literary merit as the cards all feature waka poems. Half the deck is called yomifuda ("reading cards") and often feature a portrait of the poet who wrote it. With 100 poems, this results in 100 face cards. Unsun karuta feature the face cards derived from Portuguese-suited playing cards: female knaves, knights, and kings. Portuguese cards featured dragons on their aces, which were separated into their own rank. Additionally, two more face cards were added: Un and Sun. This results in six face cards per suit.

The 'Rubaiyat-e-Ganjifa' poem (circa 1535) by Ahli Shirazi is the earliest Persian reference to Ganjifa playing cards which describes a 96-card, 8-suited pack, and features two court cards per suit: the king and the vizier. The cards became popular throughout India where most variants follow the two court cards system, with few exceptions like the obscure Mysore Chad Ganjifa having six court cards: Raja (king) on elephant or throne, Rajni (queen) in a palanquin, Amatya or Mantri (vizier) in a ratha, Senani (general) on horseback, Padathi or Sevaka (foot-soldier or servant) and Dhwaja (flag or banner).

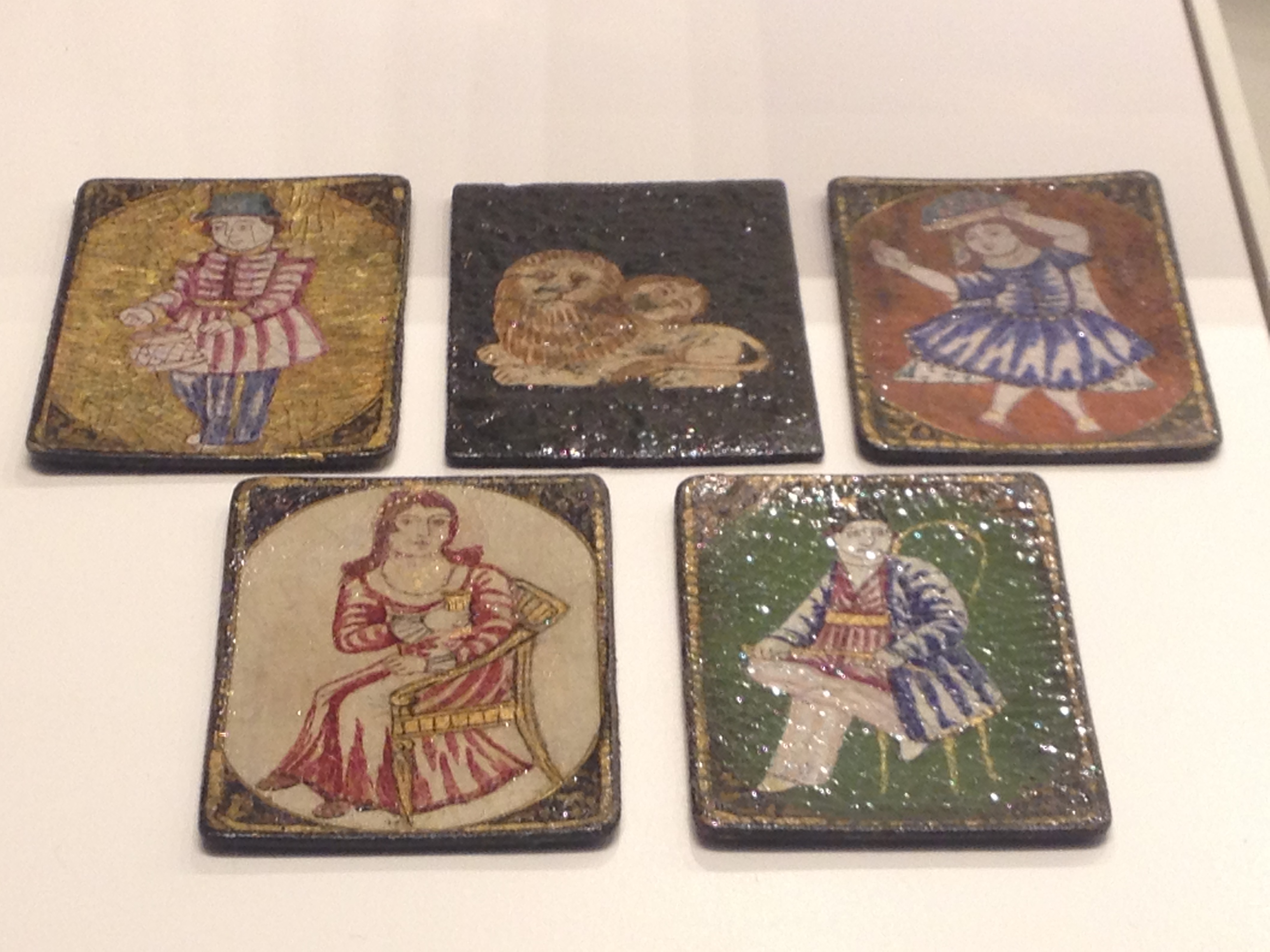
As-Nas cards

In 17th-century Persia, there were accounts of 25-card As-Nas packs in use, with five colored suits, each suit having one court card and four numeral cards. The pack developed into having an ace and four court cards (Shah (شاه, King), Bibi (بی‌بی, Lady), Serbaz (سرباز, Soldier), and Lakat (لکات, Dancer)) per suit. In 1877, Robert Murdoch Smith wrote that these cards were "gradually falling into disuse, being replaced by European".

Throughout most of their history, face cards were not reversible. Players may accidentally reveal that they hold a face card if they flip them right-side up. During the 18th century, Trappola and Tarocco Bolognese decks became the first to be reversible. The trend towards double-headed cards continued throughout the 19th and 20th centuries. Some patterns resisted the innovation, most notably Spanish-suited decks where full figured courts remain dominant.

== Cards ==
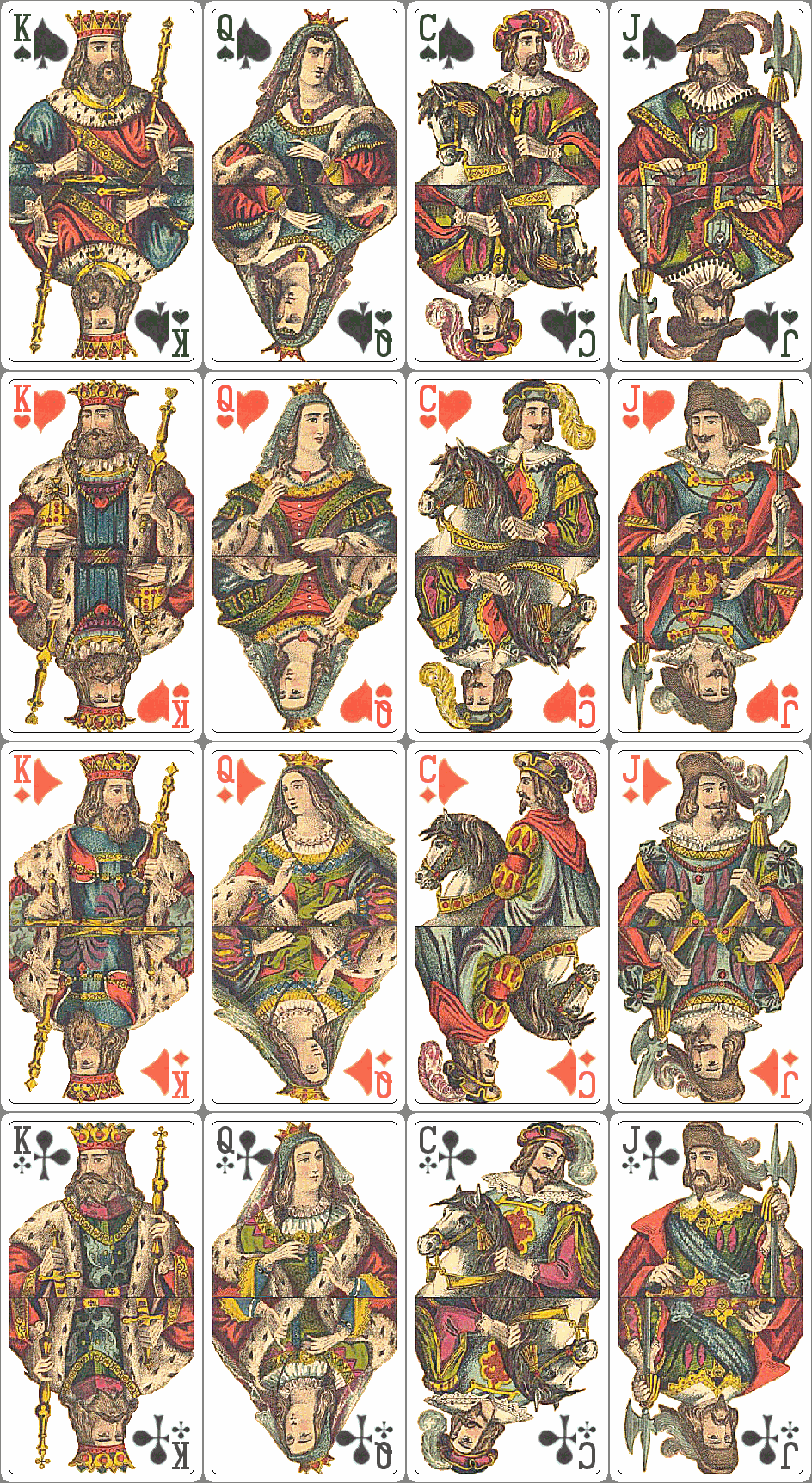
Face cards from the Tarot Nouveau

Current playing cards are structured as follows:

- German and Swiss playing cards have three male face cards per suit, Unter/Under (a lower-class man or soldier), Ober (a higher ranking man), and König (a seated King).
- Italian and Spanish playing cards have the Fante or Sota (Knave, a younger man standing), Cavallo or Caballo (Knight or Cavalier, a man sitting on a horse) and Re or Rey (King, wearing a crown). Italian suited kings are seated while Spanish suited kings stand. A few Spanish suited patterns and Portuguese suited patterns replace male knaves with female counterparts. The specific Unsun karuta deck has three additional ranks: the "Un", the "Sun", and the Dragon.
- French playing cards replaced the middle male with the Queen so it became Knave or "Jack", Queen, and King. French suited Kings stand.
- French and Latin tarot decks have four face cards per suit. Their order is Knave, Knight, Queen, and King for a total of 16 face cards. Figures appearing on tarot trumps are not considered to be face cards.
- Ganjifa playing cards have two face cards per suit: the king and the vizier.

While modern decks of playing cards may contain one or more Jokers depicting a person, such as a jester or clown, they are not normally considered face cards. The earliest Jokers, known as Best Bowers, did not depict people until the late 1860s.
