= Navagunjara =

Mythical creature composed of nine animals in Hinduism

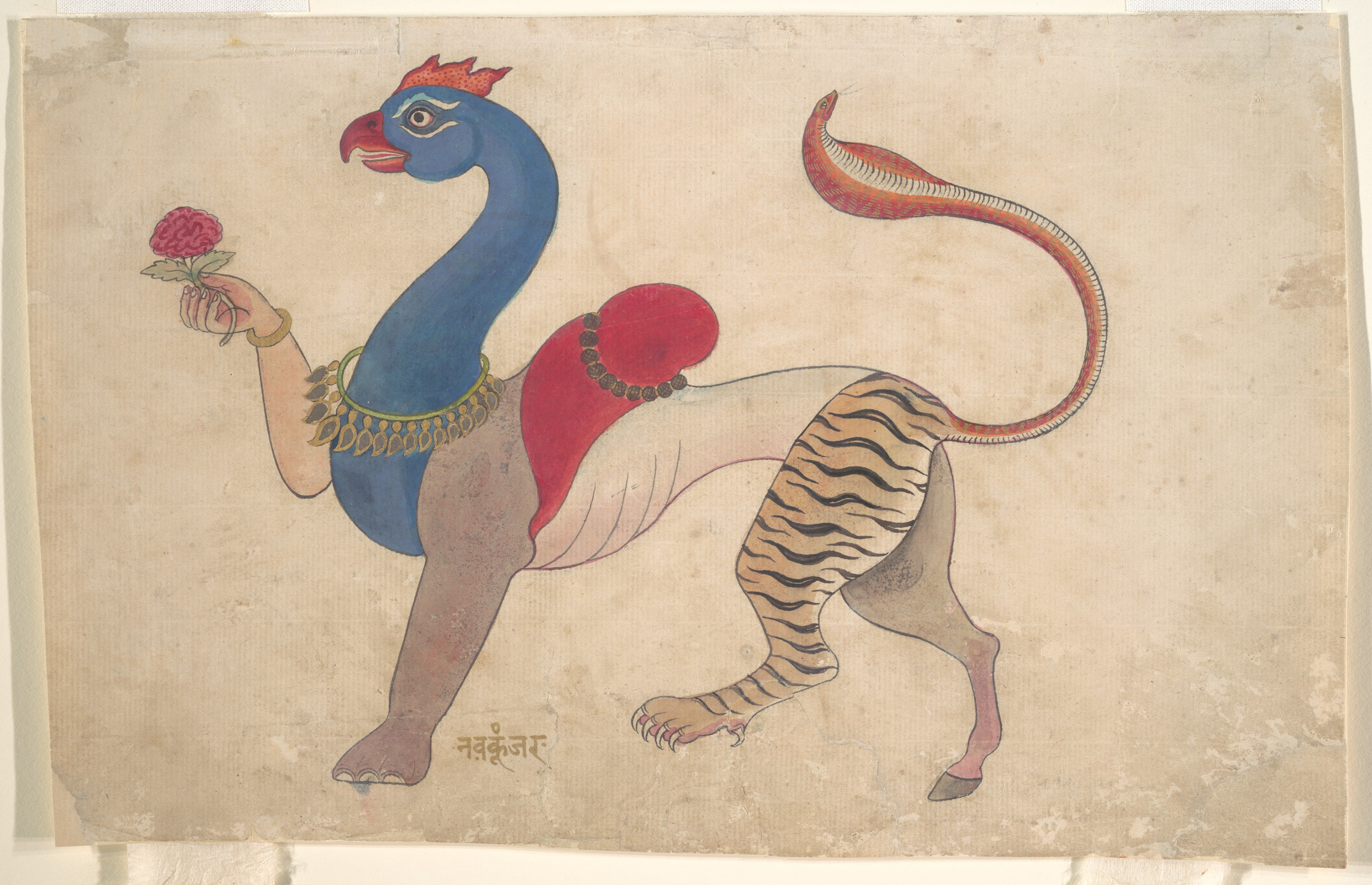
Navagunjara

Navaguñjara (Sanskrit: नवगुञ्जर), or Nabaguñjara (Odia: ନବଗୁଞ୍ଜର) is a magical legendary creature composed of nine different animals in Hinduism.

The animal is a common motif in the Pattachitra style of painting, of the Eastern Indian state of Odisha. It is considered an astral form of the Hindu god Vishnu, or of Krishna, who is considered an avatar of Vishnu. It is considered a variant of the Vishvarupa (omnipresent or vast) form of Krishna, that he displays to Arjuna, as mentioned in the Bhagavad Gita, a part of the epic Mahabharata.

== Etymology ==
Originally the word was Nava-kunjara not Nava-gunjara. Across Hindu, Buddhist, Pali, and other texts, there are numerous instances of kunjara as a name for a great monkey, a serpent, an elephant, and an asura among others.

One interpretation is that the locals who heard the story described it as an animal having a mixture of qualities found in other animals. Later, the pronunciation changed from Navakunjara to 'Nabagunjara', which led to the belief of an animal having the qualities of nine animals. For the word 'guna' (गुण) in Sanskrit means 'quality'. But 'Nabagunjara' is not a grammatically correct word in Sanskrit.

== Literature ==
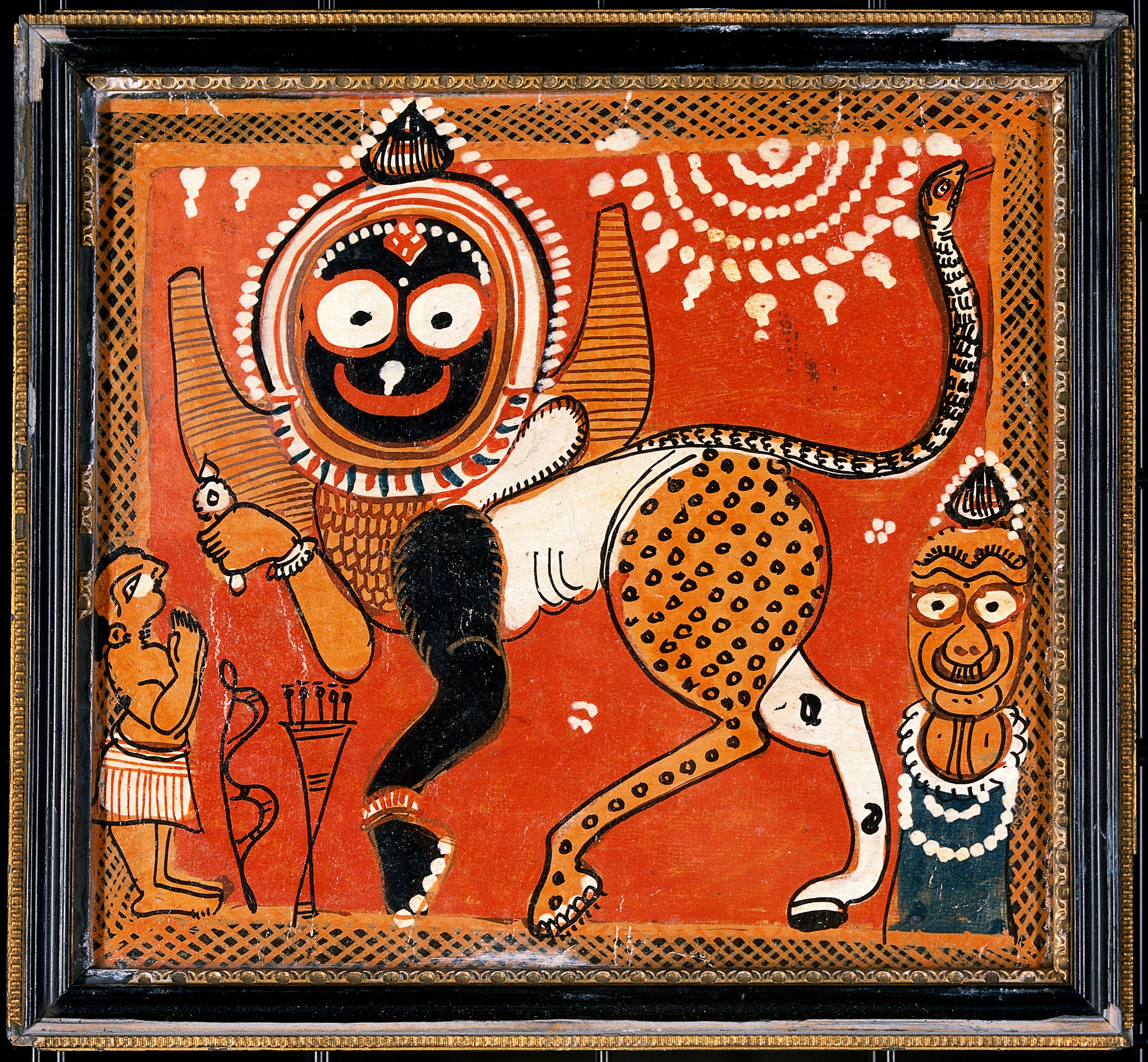
Jagannatha as Navagunjara

The version of the Hindu epic Mahabharata, written by the Odia poet Sarala Dasa, narrates the legend of Navagunjara; no other version has the story. Once, when Arjuna was doing penance on a hill, Krishna-Vishnu appears to him as Navagunjara. Navagunjara has the head of a rooster, and stands on three feet, those of an elephant, tiger and deer or horse; the fourth limb is a raised human arm carrying a lotus or a wheel. The beast has the neck of a peacock, the back or hump of a bull and the waist of a lion; the tail is a serpent. Initially, Arjuna was terrified as well as mesmerized by the strange creature and raises his bow to shoot it. Finally, Arjuna realizes that Navagunjara is a manifestation of Vishnu and drops his weapons, bowing before Navagunjara.

== Architecture ==
The Navagunjara-Arjuna scene is sculpted at the northern side of the Jagannath Temple, Puri.

== In popular culture ==
Navagunjara is also depicted in Ganjifa playing cards as the King card and Arjuna as the minister card, in parts of Odisha, mainly in Puri district and Ath-Rangi Sara in Ganjam district, Odisha. This set is known as Navagunjara.

== See also ==
- Nawarupa
