= Thoth Tarot =

Divinatory tarot deck

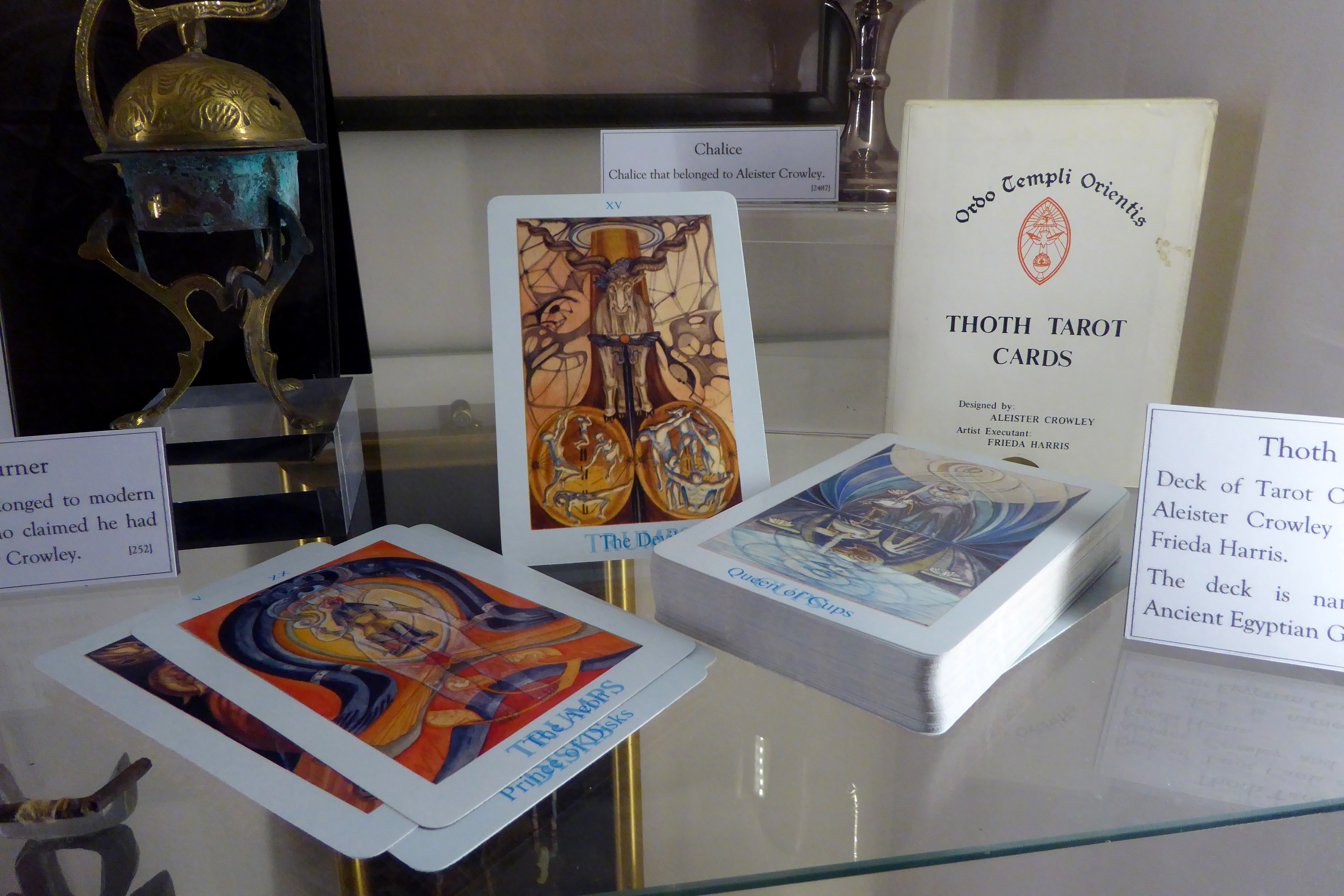
Display of the Thoth tarot cards in a museum

Thoth Tarot is an esoteric tarot deck painted by Lady Frieda Harris for Aleister Crowley. Crowley referred to this deck as The Book of Thoth, and also wrote a 1944 book of that title intended for use with the deck.

== Background ==
Crowley originally intended the Thoth deck to be a six-month project aimed at updating the traditional pictorial symbolism of the tarot. However, due to increased scope, the project eventually spanned five years, between 1938 and 1943.

== Symbolism ==
The illustrations of the deck feature symbolism based upon Crowley's incorporation of imagery from many disparate disciplines, including science and philosophy and various occult systems (as described in detail in his The Book of Thoth).

== Deck variants ==
As reported in the table below there are seven known major versions of the Thoth Tarot, taken from six different sets of photographs, each with significant differences from each other.

Version	Year	Publisher	Key Differences
Sangreal	1968	Simpson Printing Co.	First printed version, with monochrome blue ink on the front and red ink on the back. No back border. Printed in USA.
White Box A	1972	Llewellyn	First colored version, with printing errors on the Ace of Disks and the 8 of Cups. No back border. Printed in Hong Kong.
White Box B	1973	Llewellyn	Corrected printing mistakes. Printed in USA. No back border.
White Box C (Greenie)	1978	U.S.Games Systems, Weiser	New photography of the paintings. Introduced the Unicursal Hexagram card and the Ordo Templi Orientis reference card. No back border. Printed in Belgium.
Blue Box A	1986	AGMuller	New photography again. Added the two extra 'Magician' cards and a gray back border. Introduced a 'standard' size along with the 'deLuxe' large-format cards. Printed in Switzerland.
Blue Box B	1996	AGMuller	New photography again. Introduced the 'pocket size', making three sizes in total. Removed the two extra 'Magician' cards and replaced with an O.T.O. card and a rainbow-colored Unicursal Hexagram. Changed back border to white. Printed in Switzerland and Belgium.
Gold Box	2008	AGMuller/Urania	New digital photography of the restored paintings. Changed back border to gold and introduced a gold-colored Unicursal Hexagram. Printed in Belgium.

== Differences from the Rider–Waite Tarot ==
=== Order and names of trumps ===
Crowley renamed several of the trumps compared to earlier arrangements, and also re-arranged the numerical, astrological and Hebrew alphabet correspondences of 4 trumps compared to the Hermetic Order of the Golden Dawn's inner order deck in accordance with the Tarot of Marseilles, his 1904 book The Book of the Law (Liber AL vel Legis) and its "New Commentary." In the "New Commentary" and The Book of Thoth, Crowley demonstrates that his trump arrangement forms a double loop in the zodiac-number and letter-number correspondences compared to the Golden Dawn deck, where there is no loop.

All these old letters of my Book are aright; but צ is not the Star.

Tzaddi is the letter of The Emperor, the Trump IV, and He is the Star, the Trump XVII. Aquarius and Aries are therefore counterchanged, revolving on the pivot of Pisces, just as, in the Trumps VIII and XI, Leo and Libra do about Virgo. This last revelation makes our Tarot attributions sublimely, perfectly, flawlessly symmetrical.

For The Star is referred to Aquarius in the Zodiac, and The Emperor to Aries. Now Aries and Aquarius are on each side of Pisces, just as Leo and Libra are on each side of Virgo; that is to say, the correction in the Book of the Law gives a perfect symmetry in the zodiacal attribution, just as if a loop were formed at one end of the ellipse to correspond exactly with the existing loop at the other end.

Crowley's double loop in the zodiac
Number	Sign	Letter	Name
IV	Aquarius	Tzaddi	The Emperor
VIII	Libra	Lamed	Adjustment
XI	Leo	Tet	Lust
XVII	Aries	Heh	The Star

Rider–Waite card	Thoth equivalent
I: The Magician	I: The Magus
II: The High Priestess	II: The Priestess
VIII: Strength	XI: Lust
X: Wheel of Fortune	X: Fortune
XI: Justice	VIII: Adjustment
XIV: Temperance	XIV: Art
XX: Judgement	XX: The Æon
XXI: The World	XXI: The Universe

=== Names of court cards ===
Crowley accepted the Golden Dawn's changed names of all the court cards which can cause some confusion for people used to the more common decks. Specially since he changed the structure of the court cards, while each of the places retains much of the original meanings, there are subtle differences. The typical corresponding names are as follows:

Traditional Court Card Name	Thoth Deck Court Card Name
King	Knight
Queen	Queen
Knight	Prince
Page	Princess

== Minor Arcana ==
=== Wands ===
Number	Sign	Decan	Ruler of Decan	Name
1				The Root of the Powers of Fire
2	Aries	1st	Mars	Dominion
3	Aries	2nd	Sun	Virtue
4	Aries	3rd	Venus	Completion
5	Leo	1st	Saturn	Strife
6	Leo	2nd	Jupiter	Victory
7	Leo	3rd	Mars	Valour
8	Sagittarius	1st	Mercury	Swiftness
9	Sagittarius	2nd	Moon	Strength
10	Sagittarius	3rd	Saturn	Oppression

=== Cups ===
Number	Sign	Decan	Ruler of Decan	Name
1				The Root of the Powers of Water
2	Cancer	1st	Venus	Love
3	Cancer	2nd	Mercury	Abundance
4	Cancer	3rd	Moon	Luxury
5	Scorpio	1st	Mars	Disappointment
6	Scorpio	2nd	Sun	Pleasure
7	Scorpio	3rd	Venus	Debauch
8	Pisces	1st	Saturn	Indolence
9	Pisces	2nd	Jupiter	Happiness
10	Pisces	3rd	Mars	Satiety

=== Swords ===
Number	Sign	Decan	Ruler of Decan	Name
1				The Root of the Powers of Air
2	Libra	1st	Moon	Peace
3	Libra	2nd	Saturn	Sorrow
4	Libra	3rd	Jupiter	Truce
5	Aquarius	1st	Venus	Defeat
6	Aquarius	2nd	Mercury	Science
7	Aquarius	3rd	Moon	Futility
8	Gemini	1st	Jupiter	Interference
9	Gemini	2nd	Mars	Cruelty
10	Gemini	3rd	Sun	Ruin

=== Disks ===
Number	Sign	Decan	Ruler of Decan	Name
1				The Root of the Powers of Earth
2	Capricorn	1st	Jupiter	Change
3	Capricorn	2nd	Mars	Works
4	Capricorn	3rd	Sun	Power
5	Taurus	1st	Mercury	Worry
6	Taurus	2nd	Moon	Success
7	Taurus	3rd	Saturn	Failure
8	Virgo	1st	Sun	Prudence
9	Virgo	2nd	Venus	Gain
10	Virgo	3rd	Mercury	Wealth

== Restoration of original artwork ==
Harris' renditions of the tarot are on watercolor paper affixed to a thick backing; the acidity of the backing, according to a report from 2006, resulted in discoloration of borders, and to some extent, the paintings themselves. The paintings also required cleaning and the repair of small tears. A conservation plan called for cleaning the surfaces, the removal of backing (while retaining original inscriptions), reuse of the hand-painted window mats, and replacement of overlays with acid-free, museum-quality paper. The project was completed in 2011. The paintings are stored by the Warburg Institute; work was completed by the Institute's in-house specialist, Susan Campion.

== See also ==
- I Ching divination
