= Sola Busca tarot =

15th-century Italian tarot deck

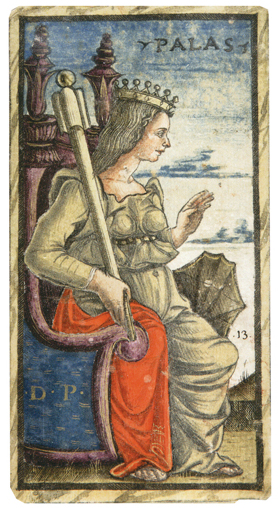
The Queen of Batons ("PALAS") from the Sola-Busca Tarot Deck, now in the Brera Museum

The Sola Busca tarot is the earliest completely extant example of a 78-card tarot deck. It is also the earliest tarot deck in which all the plain suit cards are illustrated and it is also the earliest tarot deck in which the trump card illustrations deviate from the classic tarot iconography. Unlike the earlier Visconti-Sforza tarot decks, the cards of the Sola Busca are numbered. The trump cards have Roman numerals while the pips of the plain suits have Arabic numerals.

The deck was created by an unknown artist and engraved onto metal in the late 15th century. A single complete hand-painted deck is known to exist, along with 35 uncolored cards held by various museums. The deck is notable not only for its age, but also for the quality of its artwork, which is characterized by expressive figures engraved with precise contours and shading. While various theories have been suggested about who created the deck, including a 2013 study identifying their author as the 15th-century painter Nicola di Maestro Antonio di Ancona, its authorship remains uncertain.

== Composition ==
The Sola-Busca deck comprises 78 cards including 21 trumps (trionfi) plus the Fool (Matte) and 56 suit cards. There had been many previous decks structured in this way. The names and illustrations on the trump cards in the Sola Busca are somewhat idiosyncratic for its time. Naming face cards after famous classical or biblical figures, as well as the departure from traditional trump iconography, are traits shared by the contemporary Boiardo–Viti pack, along with later French-suited playing cards and tarot decks, such as the Bourgeois Tarot and Industrie und Glück.

The characters depicted in the Sola-Busca cards include Nebuchadnezzar and Gaius Marius, the uncle of Julius Caesar. Trump cards loosely follow the rise and fall of the Roman Empire, and include members of the Roman Pantheon such as Bacchus. All the characters can be easily linked to their equivalents in standard tarot decks.

== Painted deck ==
The complete painted deck is housed at the Brera Museum in Milan. It can trace its provenance to the noble Busca-Serbelloni family. In the early 19th century, the deck was owned by Marchioness Busca (born Duchess Serbelloni) of Milan. In 1907, the Busca-Serbelloni family donated black-and-white photographs of all 78 cards to the British Museum, where they were likely seen by A. E. Waite and Pamela Colman Smith, inspiring the subsequent Rider–Waite Tarot deck. From 1948, the deck was owned by the Sola-Busca family, from which it received its name. In 2009, the deck was purchased for €800,000 by the Italian Ministry of Cultural Heritage and Activities and delivered to the Brera Museum.

== Unpainted cards ==
Thirty-five unpainted cards are also known. The Albertina museum in Vienna owns 23, including all of the trumps except the first and last, Mato and Nabuchodenasor. The 20 trump cards originally belonged to Count Moritz von Fries, while the other three came from the Imperial Court Library.

The British Museum owns four unpainted cards, which it purchased from William and George Smith in 1845. Four unpainted cards are also housed in Hamburg and Paris.

== Influence ==
The similarities between the artwork of the Minor Arcana of the Waite-Smith deck and Sola-Busca's plain suits has led some scholars to suggest that artist Pamela Colman Smith drew inspiration from the earlier work. Smith created the art for her deck two years after the acquisition of photographs of the Sola-Busca deck by the British Museum, and likely saw the cards on display there. Notable similarities include the Three of Swords and the Ten of Wands in the Rider deck, which is very similar to the Ten of Swords in the Sola-Busca deck. It also adopted the same idiosyncratic position for Strength, in its Major Arcana.

== Research ==
In 1938, Arthur Mayger Hind described the Sola Busca Tarot in his Early Italian Engravings and supposed that the deck was engraved around 1490 and then hand-painted in 1491, as a result of reading some of the inscriptions on the cards. He also supposed that the deck was created for a Venetian client by Mattia Serrati da Cosandola, a miniaturist operating in Ferrara (the center of Tarot card production at the time). In fact, many inscriptions on the cards refer without any doubt to the Republic of Venice.

In 1987, in the catalogue of a great Tarot exhibition realized at the Estense Castle of Ferrara, Italian historian Giordano Berti wrote a summary of all the research made up to that point by various scholars.

In 1995 the Italian scholar Sofia Di Vincenzo, in her book titled Antichi Tarocchi illuminati. L'alchimia nei Tarocchi Sola-Busca (Turin, 1995 and Stamford, 1998), argued that many images of the Sola Busca deck are related to themes of European alchemy as practised during the Renaissance.

In 1998, the German publisher Wolfgang Mayer printed, for the first time, a faithful version of the 78 cards in a limited edition of 700 numbered copies.

In 2012, the Pinacoteca di Brera organized the exhibition Il Segreto dei Segreti - I Tarocchi Sola Busca e la cultura ermetico-alchemica. In the catalog, the possible author of the engravings, Nicola di Maestro Antonio, the possible inspirer, the hermeticist Ludovico Lazzarelli, the year and place of execution of the color version, Venice in 1491, are suggested. It has been established in an irrefutable way that the Sola Busca Tarot is linked to the hermetic-alchemical tradition. The key figure is the King of Swords, titled Alecxandro M., who, according to a legend reported in the medieval manuscript Secretum secretorum, was initiated into alchemy by his master, the philosopher Aristotle.

In addition to Alexander the Great there are other characters linked to the hermetic-alchemical tradition. The Knight of Swords, Amone, refers to Zeus Ammon, the mythical putative father of Alexander (Note: See horns of Ammon and horns of Alexander.) who welcomed him in the Siwah Oasis. The Queen of Swords, Olympias, Alexander's mother, was known as a sorceress. The Knight of Cups, Natanabo, was an Egyptian priest and magician. Prof. Gnaccolini, inspired by the study of Sofia Di Vincenzo, cites many other explicit alchemical allegories.

== Trump suit ==
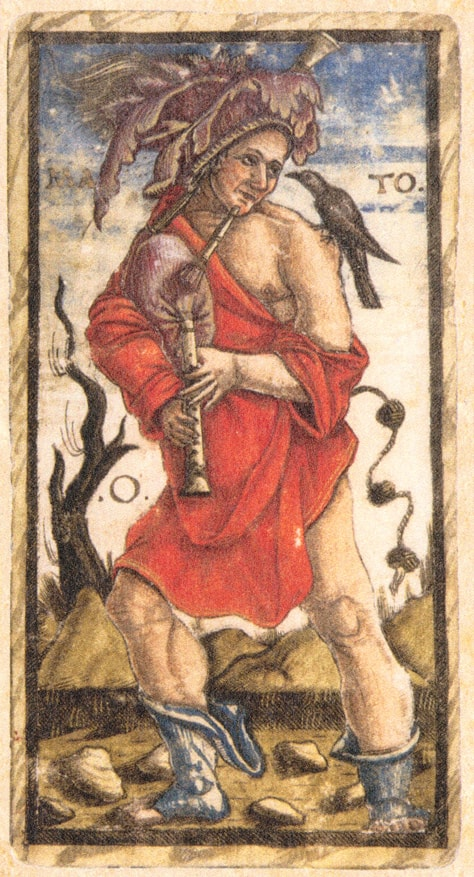
0. Mato
(Note: The Fool, explicitly depicted here, is unambiguously numbered zero, being unnumbered in all other tarots, save for Belgium, where it is counted as XXII, rather than 0. It portrays the Lord of Misrule, presiding over the medieval Feast of Fools, itself a continuation of the ancient Roman festival of Saturnalia, whose so-called "king" presided over similar mischief. The Popess, absent from this deck, might also share a satiric origin; see Pope Joan.)

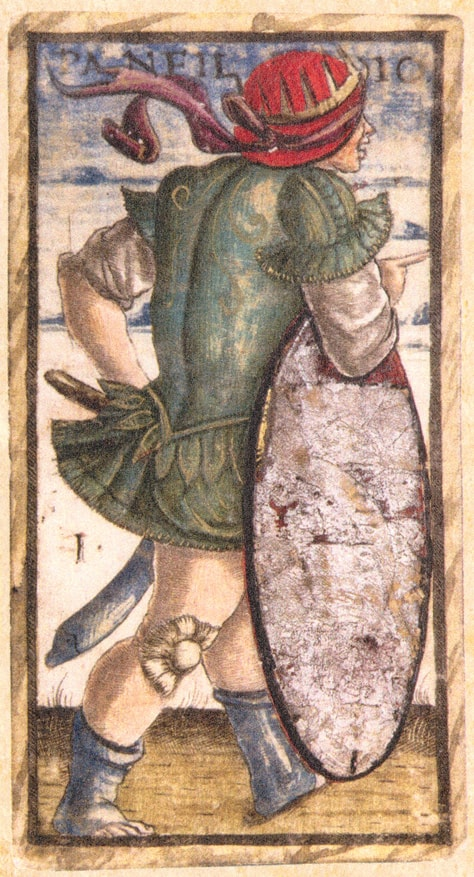
I. Panfilio
(Note: The former was the first king of Rome, after its founding by Romulus and Remus, while the latter thwarted the last attempt made by its last king of restoring the Roman monarchy, thereby consolidating the nascent Roman Republic. Their trumps occupy consecutive positions.)

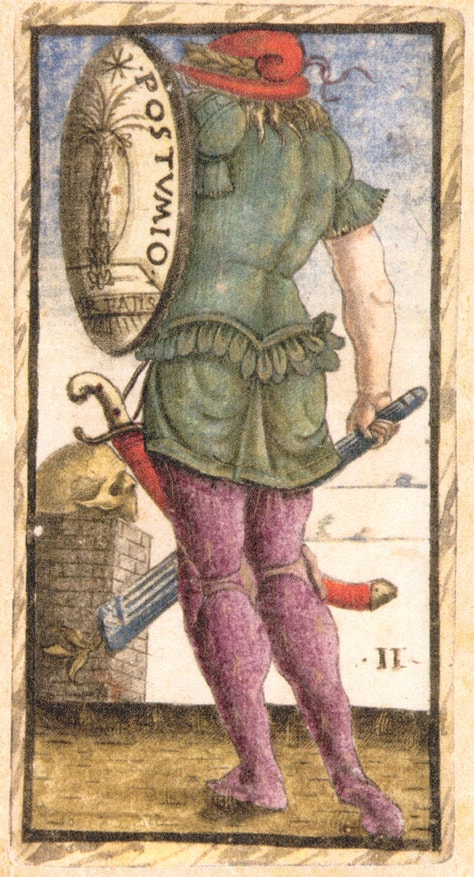
II. Postumio
(Note: Postumius (II) defeated Sextus' father (VI) at the battle of Lake Regillus.) (Note: Two of Postumius' namesake descendants (II), Spurius Postumius Albinus and Aulus Postumius Albinus, accompanied Marius (IV) and Metellus' cousin (XV) in the Jugurthine War against Bocchus (XIV).) (Note: Postumius' namesake descendant (II) and Catulus' eponymous forefather (V) were co-consuls in 242 BC. The former was prevented from leaving Rome by Metellus' ancestor (XV), noted for his heroic devotion to Pallas (Q♣).)

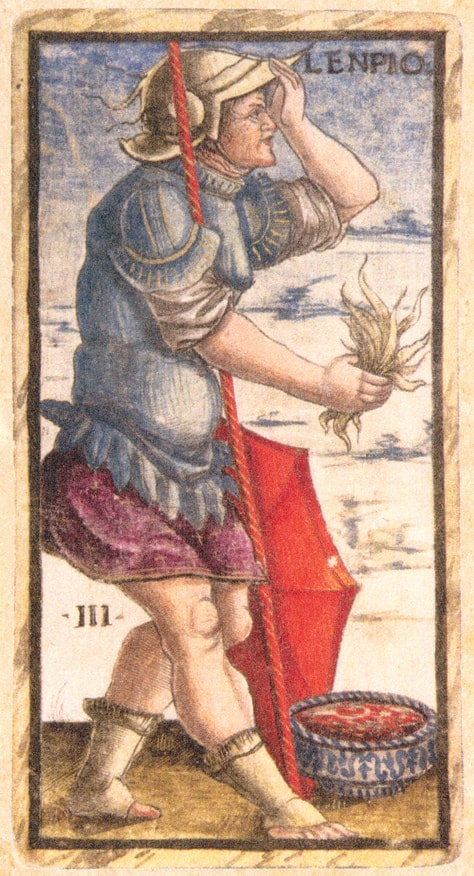
III. Lenpio
(Note: Caesar's ally and Caesar's uncle. Their trumps occupy consecutive positions.) (Note: Catulus' son (V) defeated Lepidus' father (III) at the Milvian bridge. The page of cups in the contemporary Boiardo–Viti tarot depicts Horatius Cocles' heroic defense of Pons Sublicius.)

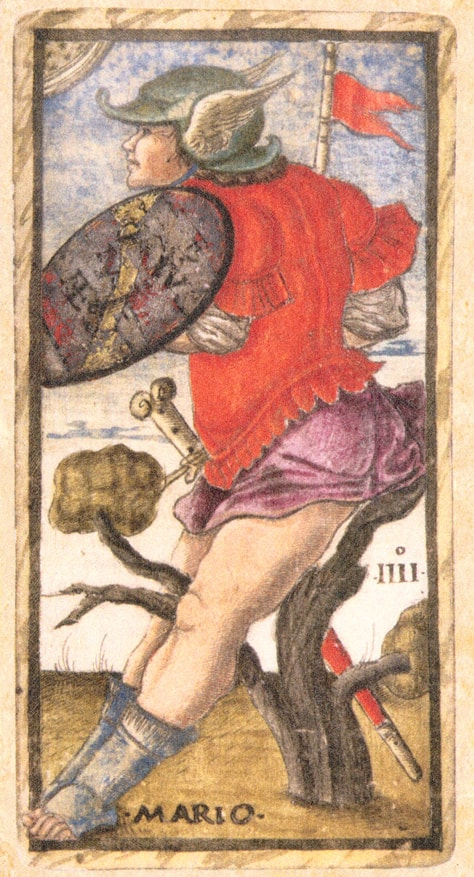
IIII. Mario
(Note: Co-consuls in 102 BC. Their trumps occupy consecutive positions.) (Note: Their sons, Gaius Marius the Younger and Gnaeus Papirius Carbo, were co-consuls in 82 BC.)

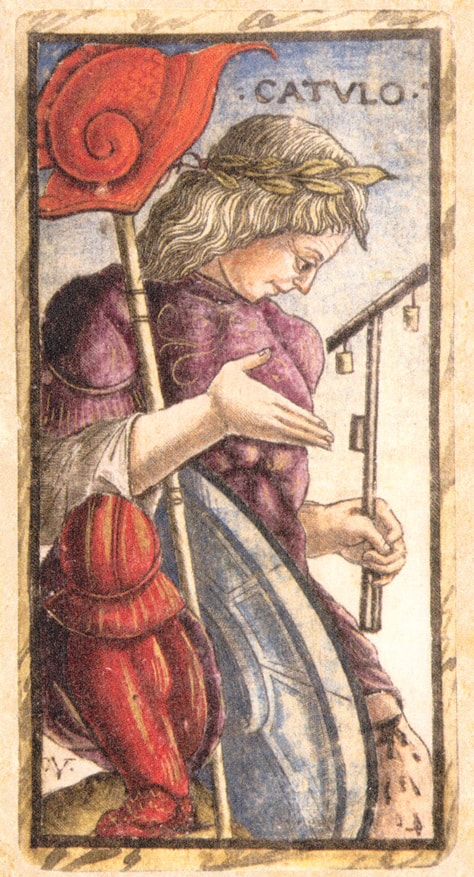
V. Catulo
(Note: The other Catullus (V) was a prolific writer, along with Cicero (XI), Cato's eponymous forefather (XIII), Livy (XVI), and Apollonius (C♣).) (Note: Cicero (XI) wrote orations on Catiline's conspiracy (V), Sestius (VI), Deiotarus (VII), Flaccus (IX), his eponymous client (XI), and Cato (XIII).) (Note: His forename or praenomen (see Roman naming conventions) coincides with his position.)

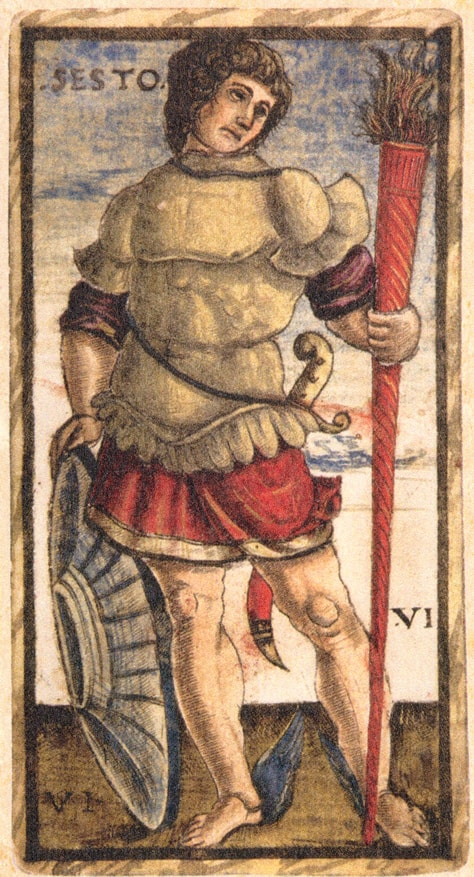
VI. Sesto
(Note: The trumps symbolizing the rape of Lucretia and the rape of Europa occupy consecutive positions.) (Note: His name explicitly marks his position. The Lovers, signifying (consensual) romantic relationships, occupies the same or previous location in all other tarots, save for Sicily.)

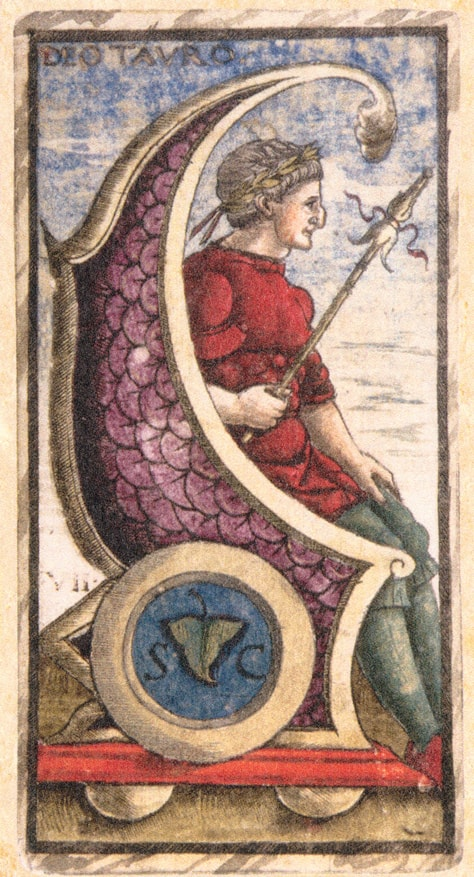
VII. Deo Tauro
(Note: Sided with Pompey against Caesar during the civil war; see Deiotarus (VII) and Metellus Scipio (XV).) (Note: The Chariot, explicitly depicted here, occupies the same position in non-Italian tarots. Zeus, unambiguously portrayed here, occupies a similar position (V) in Switzerland and Besançon, and the highest in Sicily and the medieval da Tortona deck, being labeled by his Roman equivalent, Jupiter. The contemporary Boiardo–Viti tarot has him among its face cards, featuring his eagle on the fourth-highest position.)

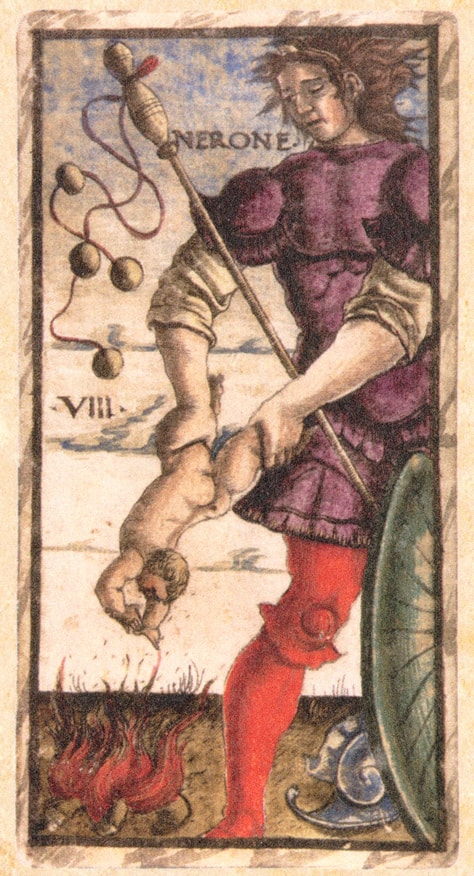
VIII. Nerone
(Note: Successive lifespans, the former dying around the same time the latter was born. Their trumps occupy consecutive positions.) (Note: Strength, employing similar imagery (Note: Commonly depicted with her arms reaching down, bent at the elbows, grabbing a lion's (open) jaws with each. Here, a child's (spread) legs are substituted for the latter, Nero being infamous for his cruelty.) in non-Italian tarots, occupies the next (Bologna) or previous (Florence) position in two other Italian tarots. The contemporary Boiardo–Viti tarot features another renowned tyrant, Herod I, on the previous position.)

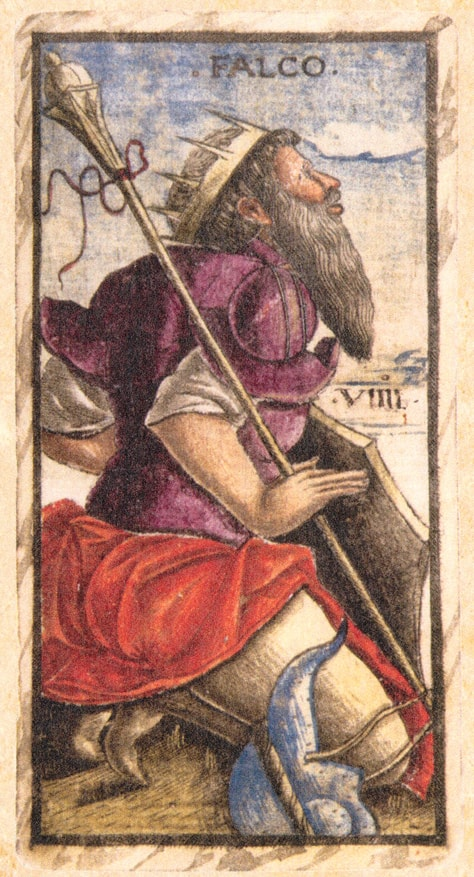
VIIII. Falco
(Note: The Hermit, employing similar imagery, (Note: Commonly depicted as an elder wearing a long beard, either leaning on crutches (Florence), with wings, near a column (Bologna), or resembling a monk holding a lamp, in all other versions.) occupies the same position in non-Italian tarots.)

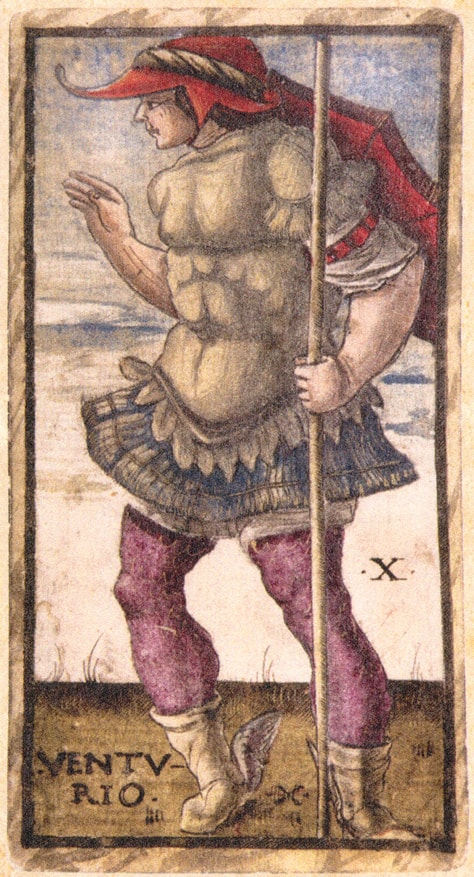
X. Venturio
(Note: According to Joannes Lydus, the Roman festival alluded here, celebrating Veturius' craftsmanship, consisted in symbolically beating with sticks a man dressed as an animal. In the contemporary Visconti-Sforza Tarot, a trump card occupying an adjacent position (Note: Either IX or XI, depending on whether its trump order is of Type B or Type C, according to Michael Dummett's classification.) depicts a man clubbing a lion, wildlife portrayed on non-Italian renditions of Strength.)

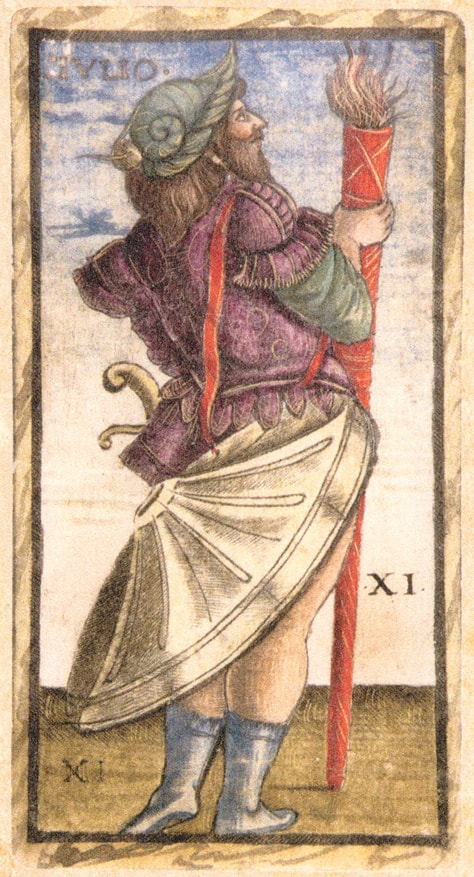
XI. Tulio
(Note: The Wheel, employing similar imagery, occupies the previous two positions in all other tarots, being placed between Strength and The Hermit in most decks, save for Florence and Sicily.)

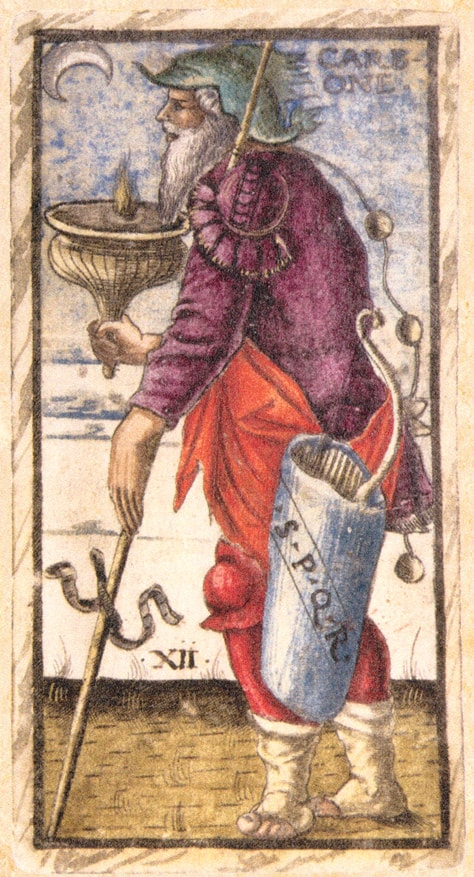
XII. Carbone
(Note: Co-consuls in 113 BC.) (Note: The Hermit, employing similar imagery, occupies the same (Sicily) or previous (Bologna and Florence) position in three other Italian tarots. The Moon, explicitly depicted here, occupies a distant position (XVII, XVIII, or XXXVII) in all other tarots.)

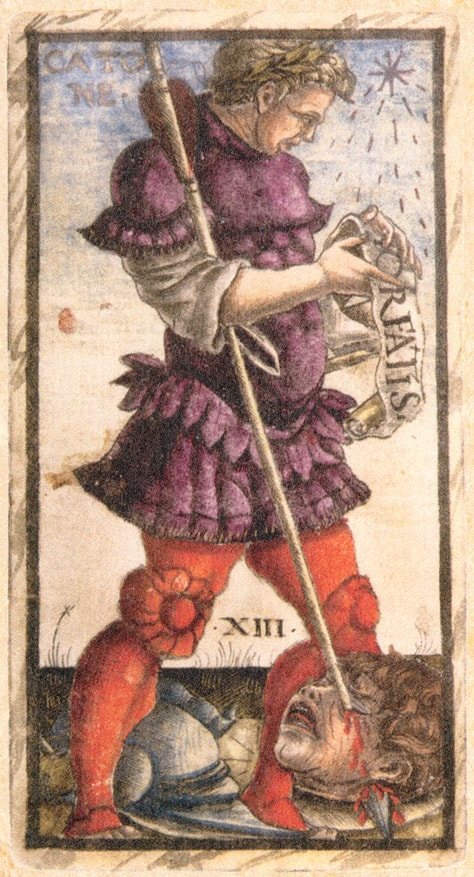
XIII. Catone
(Note: The Star, explicitly depicted here, occupies a similar position (XVI or XVII) in all other tarots, save for Florence. The only trump portraying a slain corpse. Death occupies the same position in all tarots.)

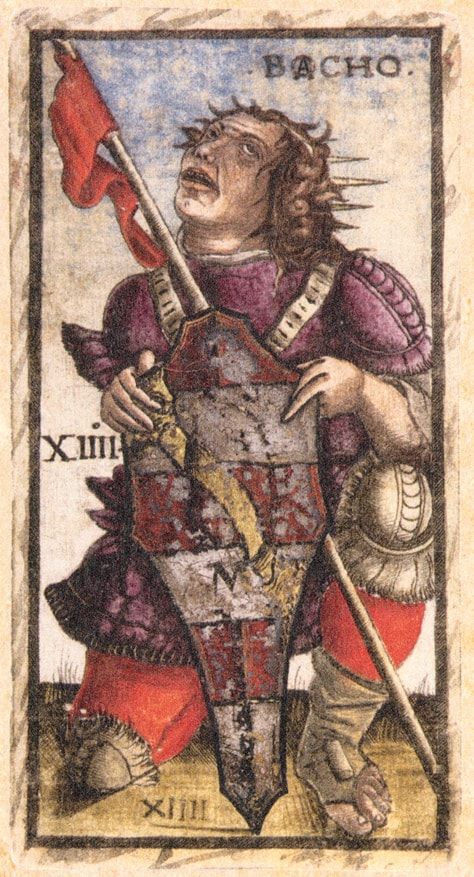
XIIII. Bocho
(Note: Their namesake descendants, Bocchus II and Metellus Scipio, were military opponents during Caesar's civil war. Their trumps occupy consecutive positions.) (Note: Betrayed his military ally and son-in-law Jugurtha, by delivering him to the Romans, who eventually executed him by hanging. The Hanged Man, labelled The Traitor in Italian versions of the game, occupies a similar position (XI or XII) in all other tarots. According to the Fourth Book of Herodotus' Histories, ancient Berber paganism offered sacrifices to the sun (XVI) and the moon (XII), exclusively. Their respective trumps occupy similar positions (XVII–XIX) in all other tarots, save for Florence. A later hand overimposed an A over the first O, in reference to Bacchus, also found in Belgian Tarot and the contemporary da Tortona deck. His equivalent is Dionysus, whose namesake, Dionysius I of Syracuse, is featured as the king of whips in the contemporary Boiardo–Viti pack.)

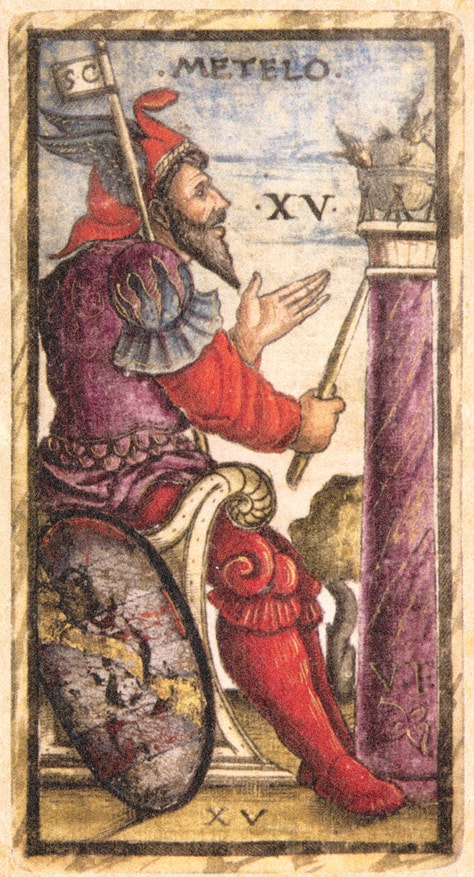
XV. Metelo
(Note: The Hermit employs similar imagery (Bologna). An upright pillar or vertical column, also found in Italian renditions of Strength, (Note: Another cardinal virtue, Temperance, occupies the previous position in non-Italian tarots.) is visible on the right. The Tower, depicted as a tree in Belgium and Viéville, occupies the same or next position in all tarots.)

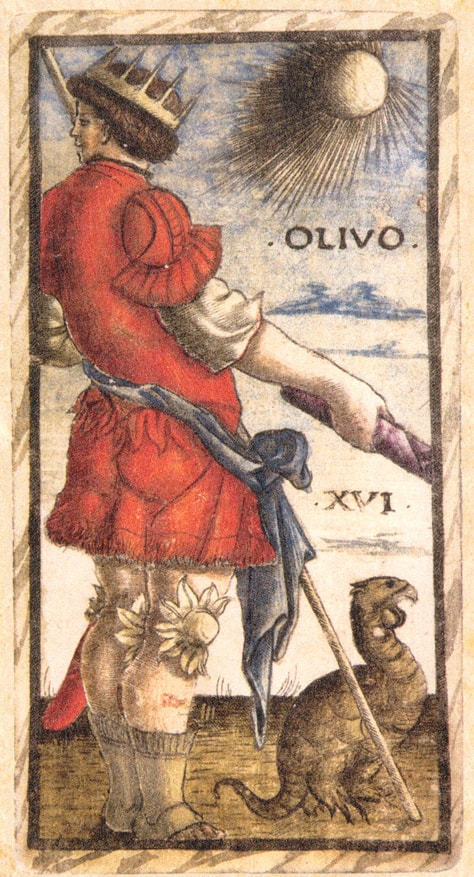
XVI. Olivo
(Note: The Sun, explicitly depicted here, occupies a similar position (XVIII or XIX) in all other tarots, save for Florence. The trumps of the contemporary da Tortona and Boiardo–Viti decks also feature animals at the bottom, as does Sicily's Jupiter card.)

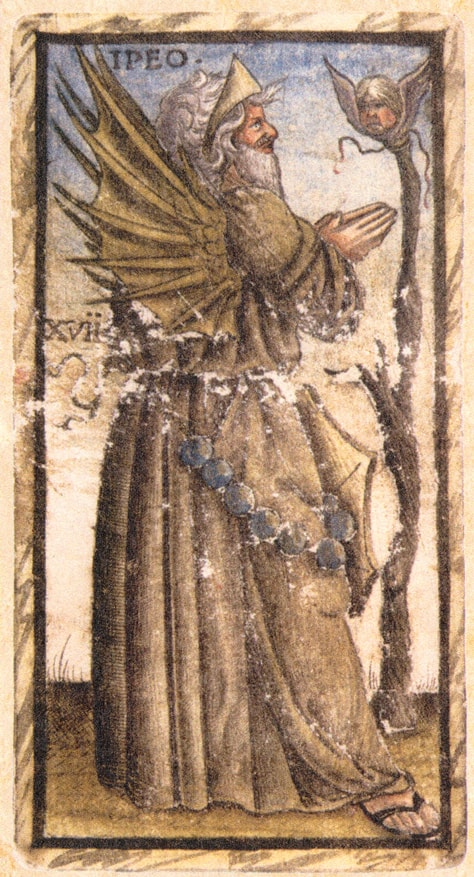
XVII. Ipeo
(Note: Conflation with Ipos, listed centuries later in Johann Weyer's Pseudomonarchia Daemonum (1577), and The Lesser Key of Solomon (ca. 1650), a grimoire inspired by the Greater Key of Solomon, written ca. 1400 in Italy, and thus contemporary with the Sola Busca deck; see also Renaissance magic. The Devil, explicitly depicted here, occupies a similar position (XIV or XV) in all other tarots.) (Note: The Hermit, (Note: Justice and The Hermit occupy consecutive positions (VIII and IX) in all non-Italian tarots, save for England and Viéville.) employing similar imagery, occupies the next position after this pair, in the contemporary Boiardo–Viti tarot.)

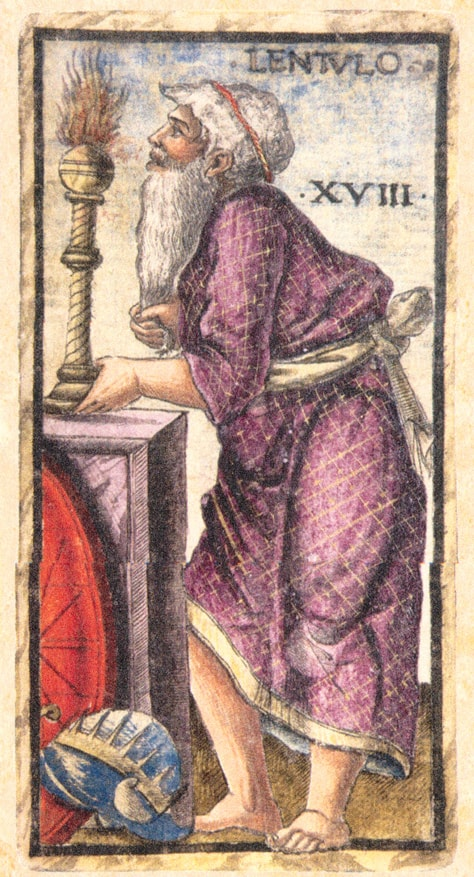
XVIII. Lentulo
(Note: An apocryphal Letter of Lentulus, offering a detailed physical description of Jesus, circulated in the fifteenth century.)

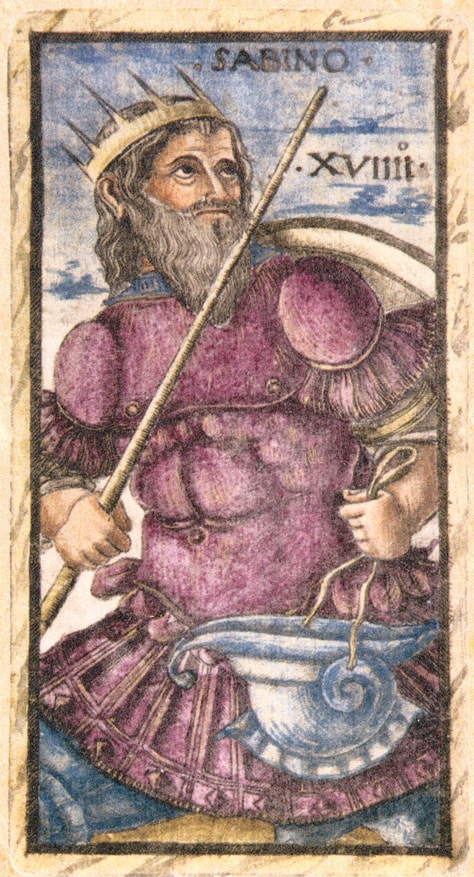
XVIIII. Sabino
(Note: Masurius Sabinus was a first century Roman jurist. Justice, (Note: Justice and Judgement embody legal concepts. Their trumps occupy consecutive positions.) employing similar imagery, (Note: Commonly depicted sitting frontally on a throne, its backrest visible in the background (in non-Italian tarots), and holding a sword.) occupies the next position in Type B tarots, according to Michael Dummett's classification.)

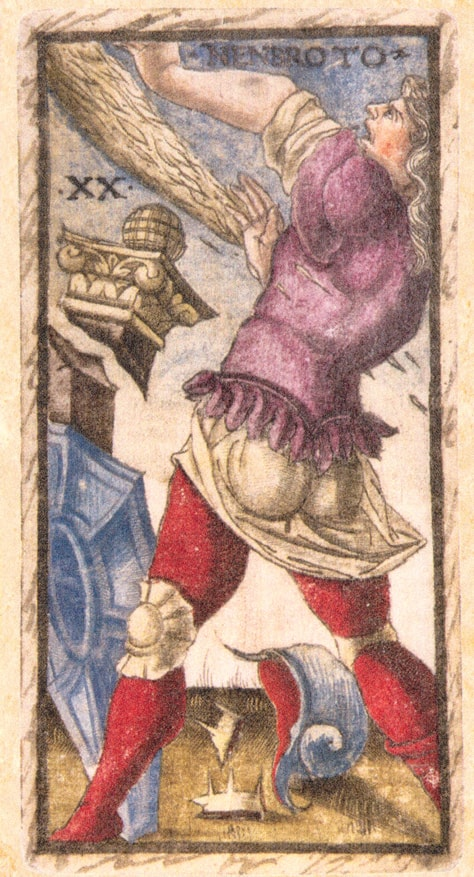
XX. Nenbroto
(Note: Both are biblical kings. Their trumps occupy consecutive positions.) (Note: The Tower of Babel, explicitly depicted here, constitutes a biblical example of divine judgement. Judgement occupies the same or adjacent position (from the end) in all tarots.)

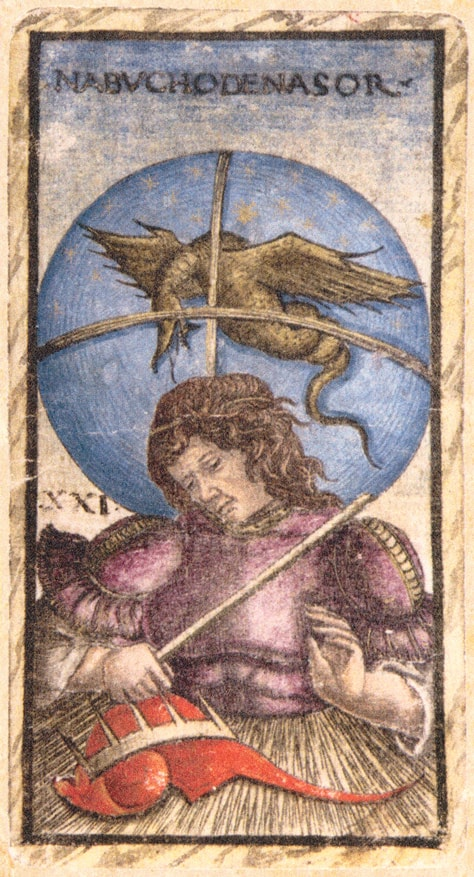
XXI. Nabucho-denasor
(Note: A T and O map accompanied by a here be dragons (Note: Dragons are also depicted on the aces of Portuguese-suited playing cards, while similar serpents, sea creatures, or sea monsters, such as ouroboros, dolphins, and the biscione, are found in other early tarot decks, namely Guildhall, Goldschmidt, and Rosenthal, respectively.) sign is portrayed in the background. The World, explicitly depicted here, occupies the last or penultimate position in all tarots.)

== Plain suits ==
=== Cups ===
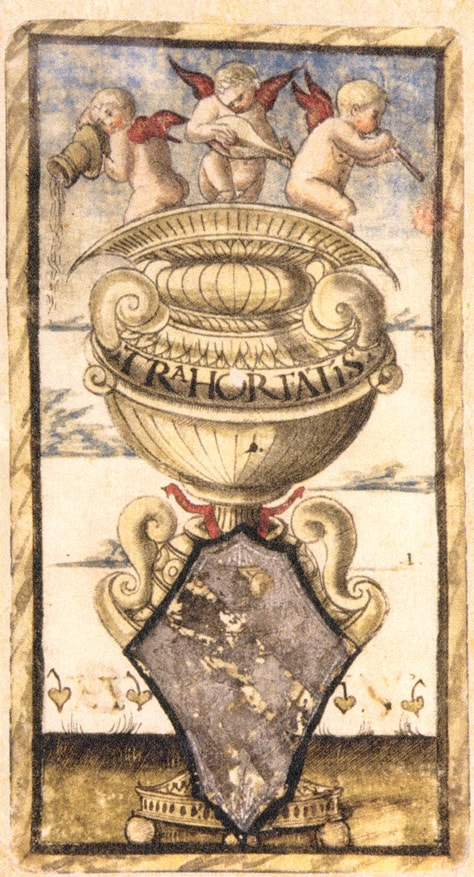
Ace of Cups

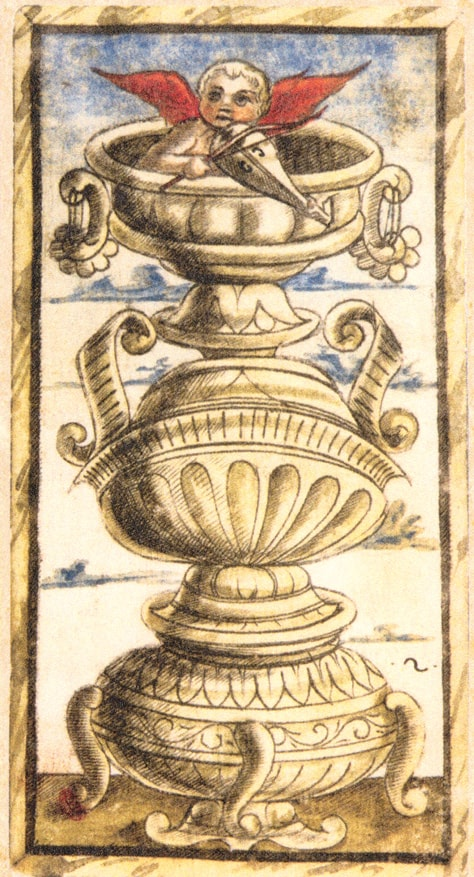
Two of Cups

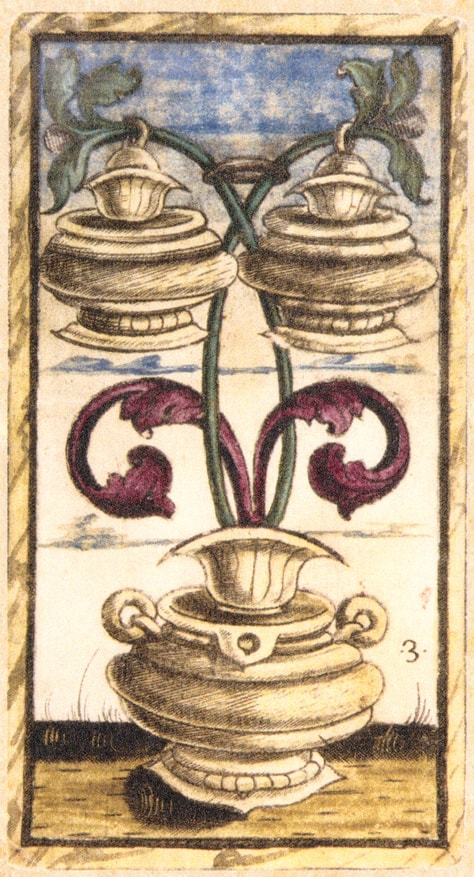
Three of Cups

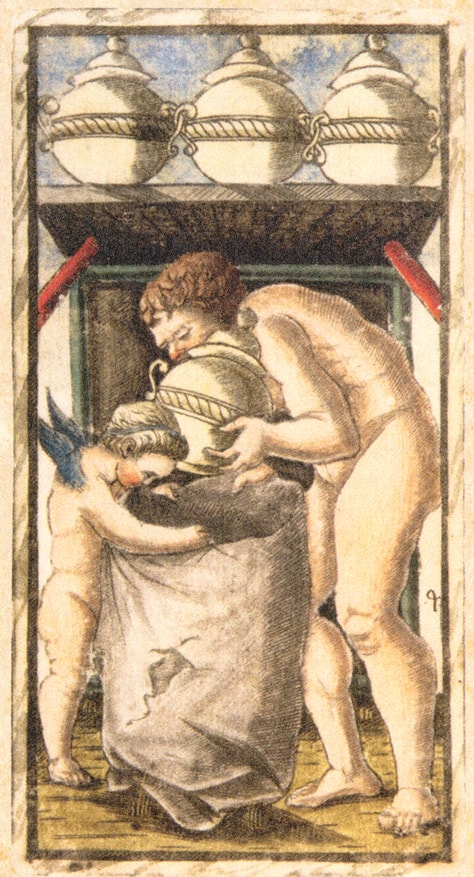
Four of Cups

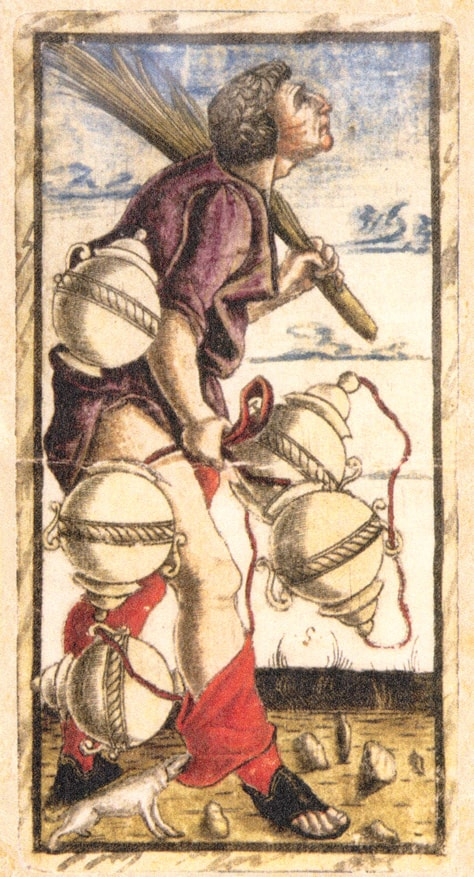
Five of Cups

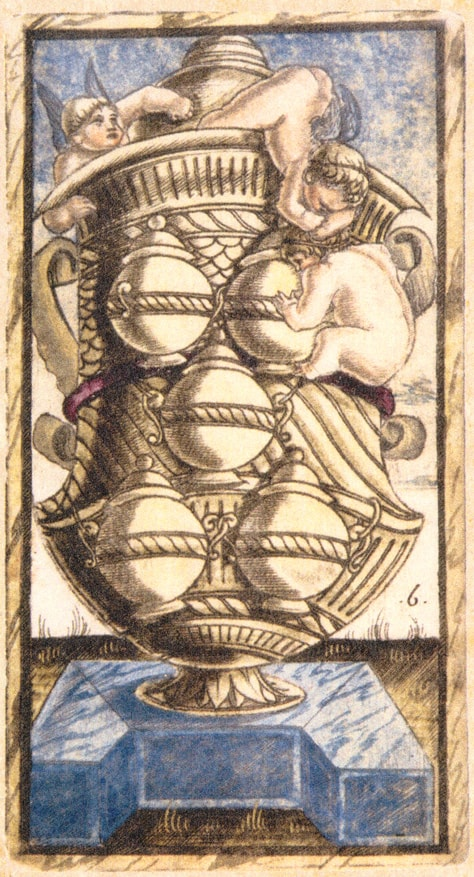
Six of Cups

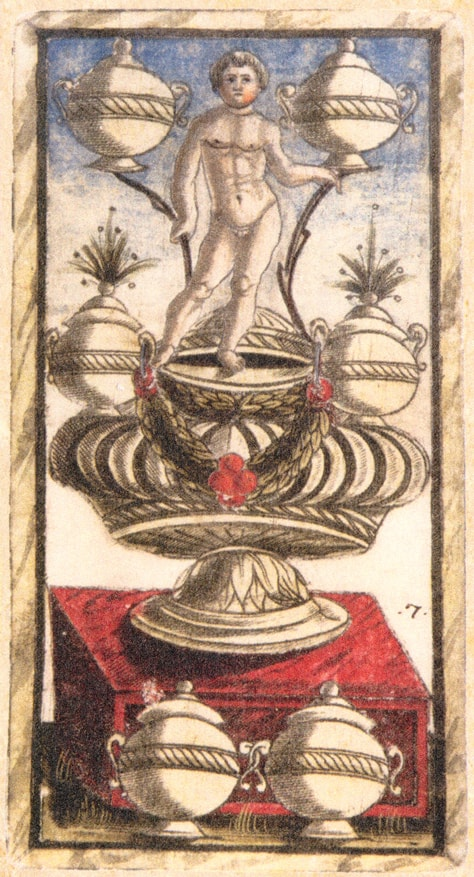
Seven of Cups

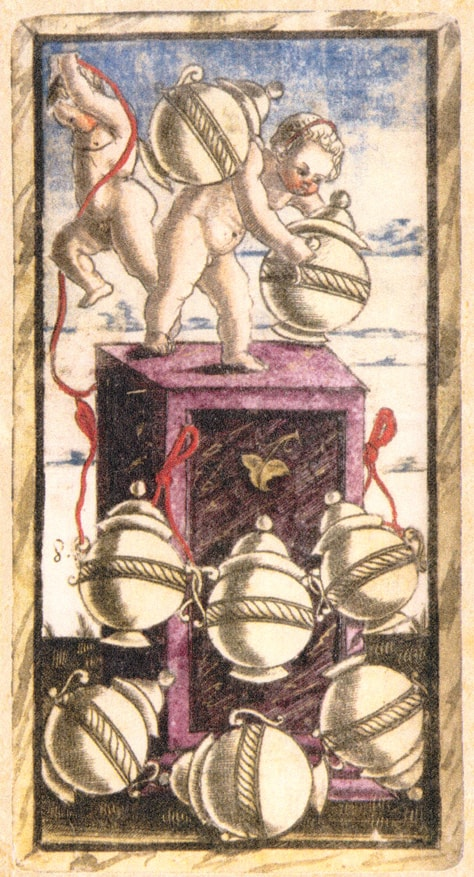
Eight of Cups

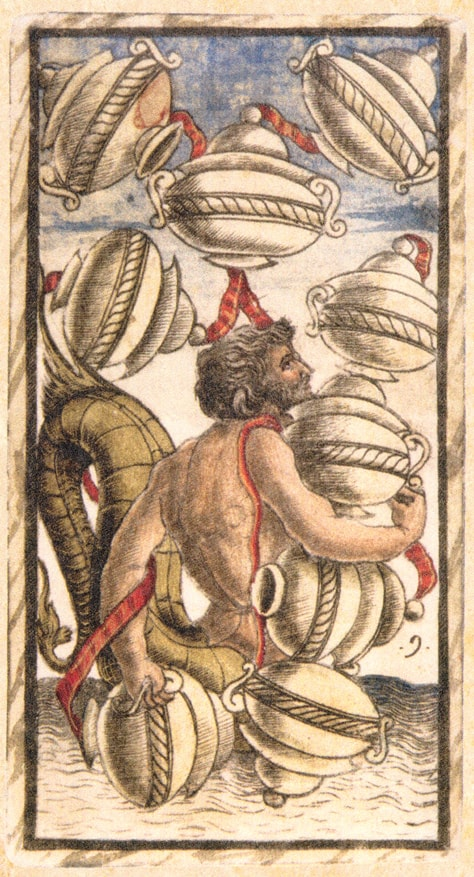
Nine of Cups

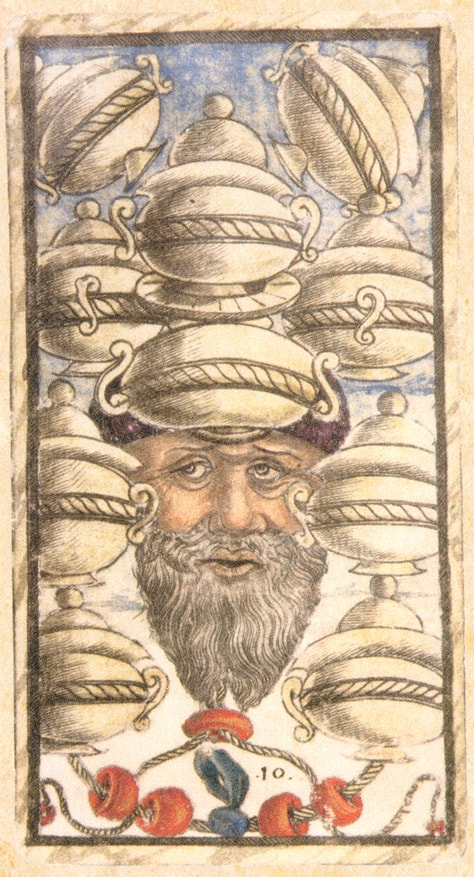
Ten of Cups

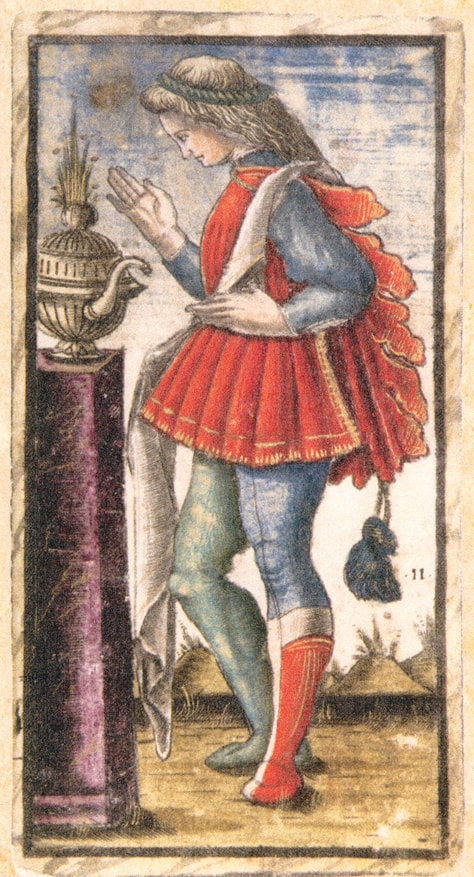
Knave of Cups

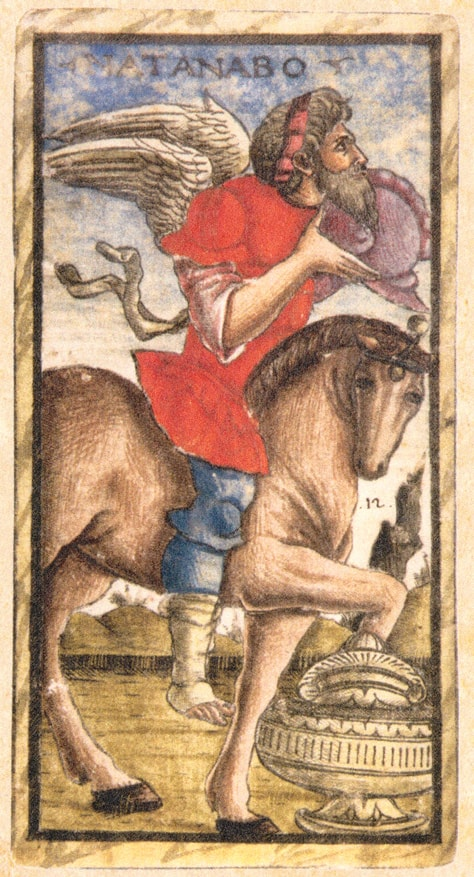
Knight of Cups:
Natanabo

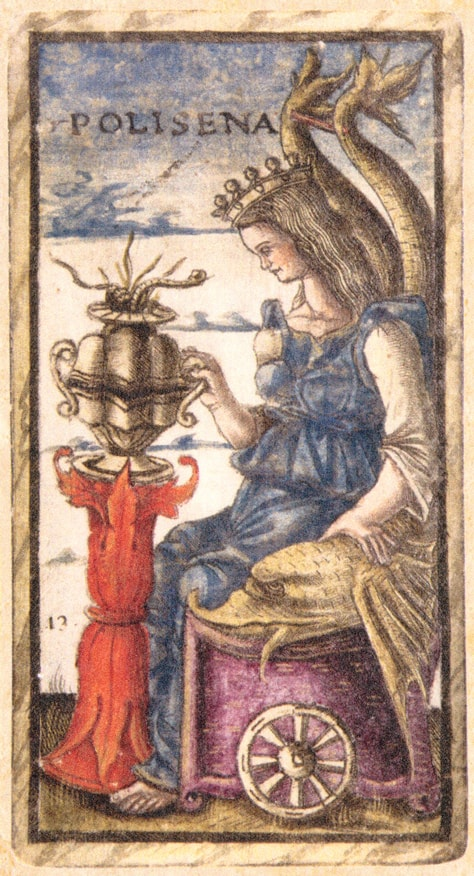
Queen of Cups:
Polisena (Note: According to Plutarch's Moralia, Olympias' (Q⚔) original name was Polyxena (Q♣).)

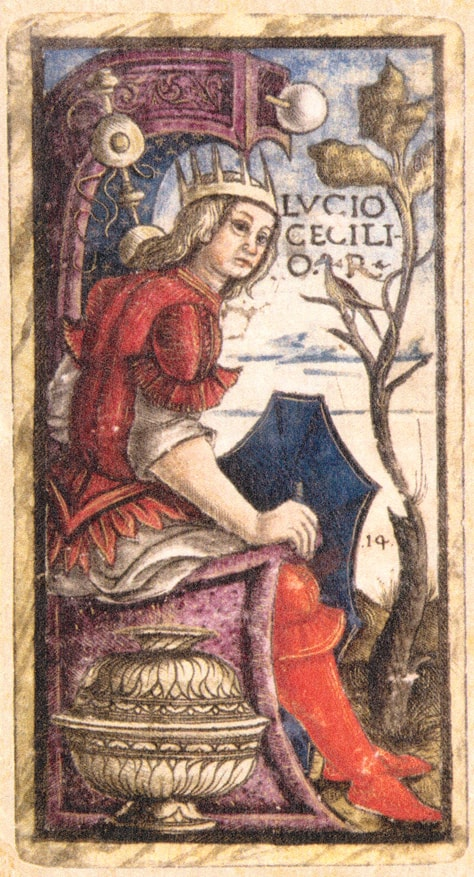
King of Cups:
Lucio Cecilio R.

=== Coins ===
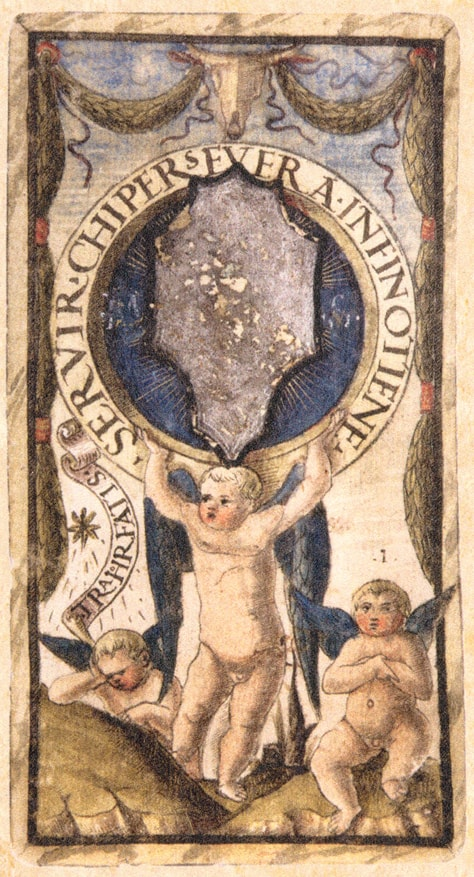
Ace of Coins

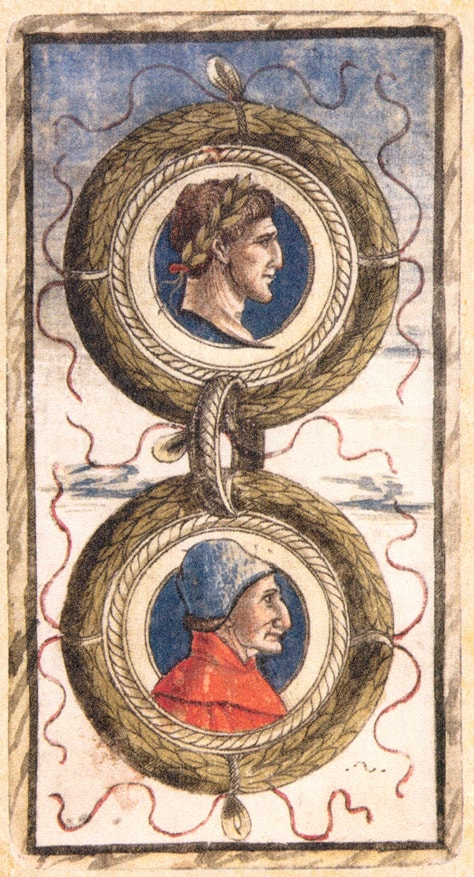
Two of Coins

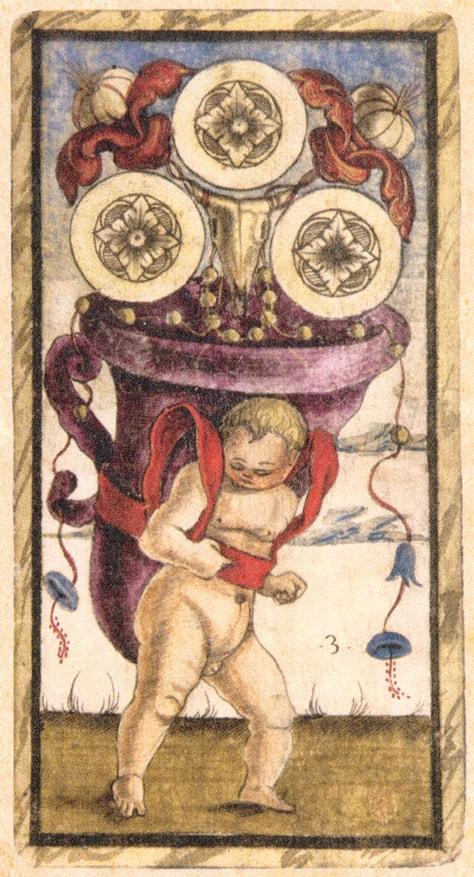
Three of Coins

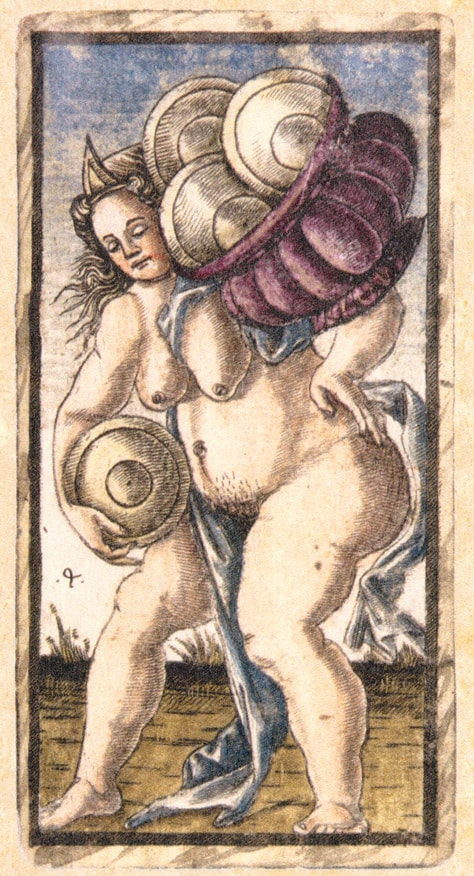
Four of Coins

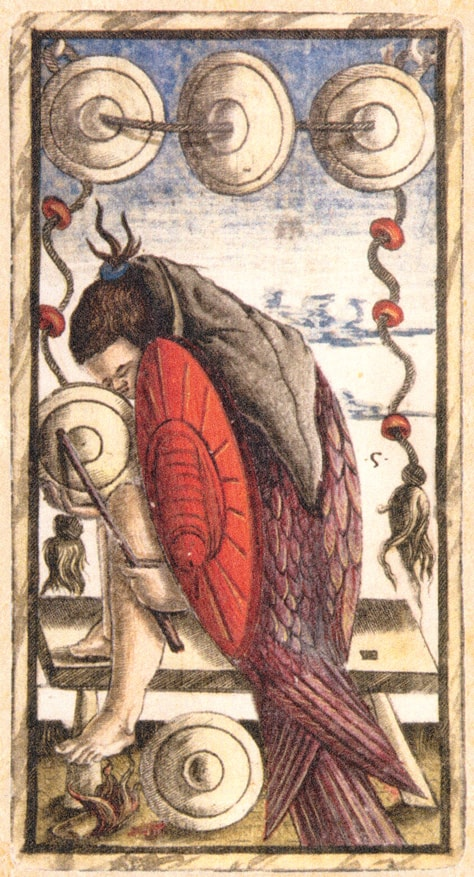
Five of Coins

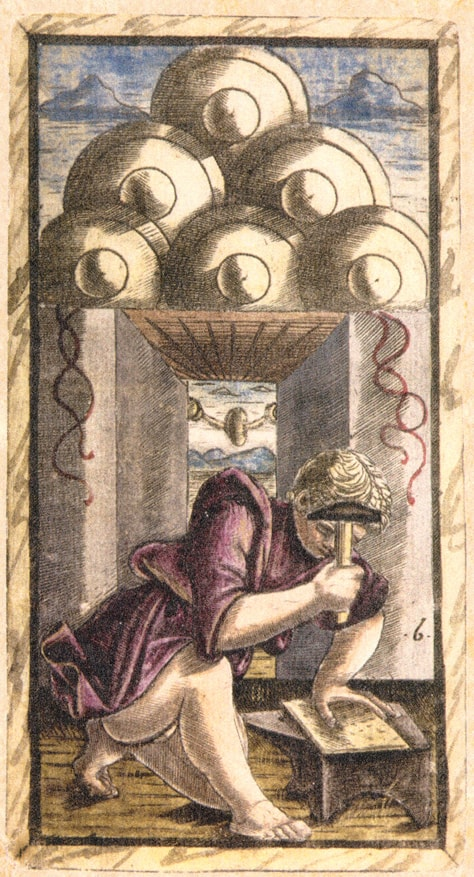
Six of Coins

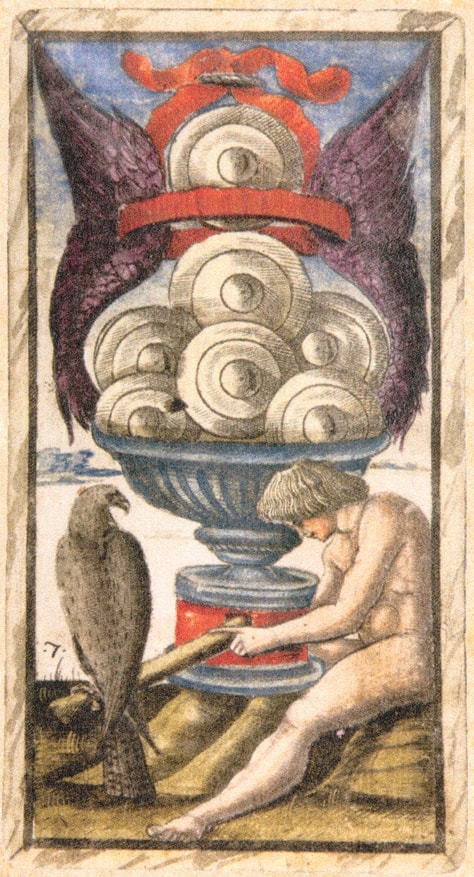
Seven of Coins

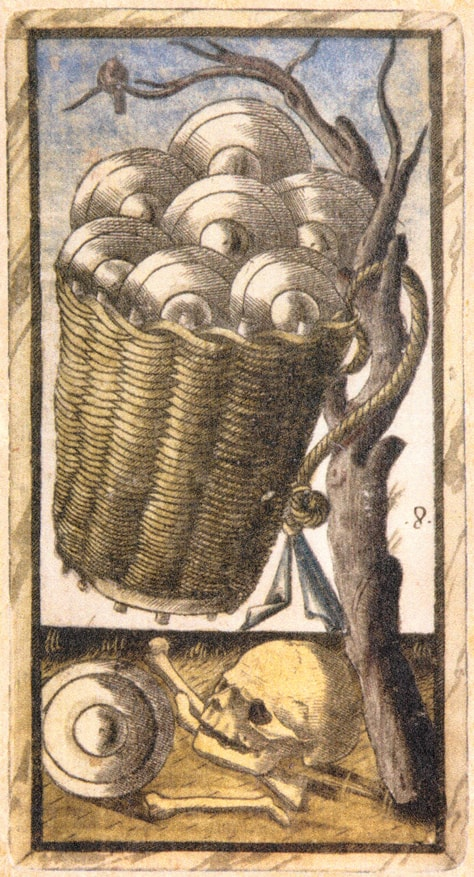
Eight of Coins

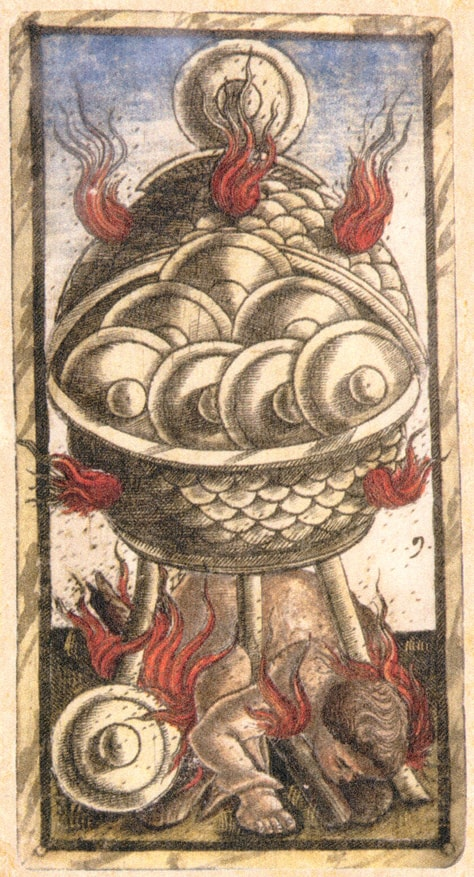
Nine of Coins

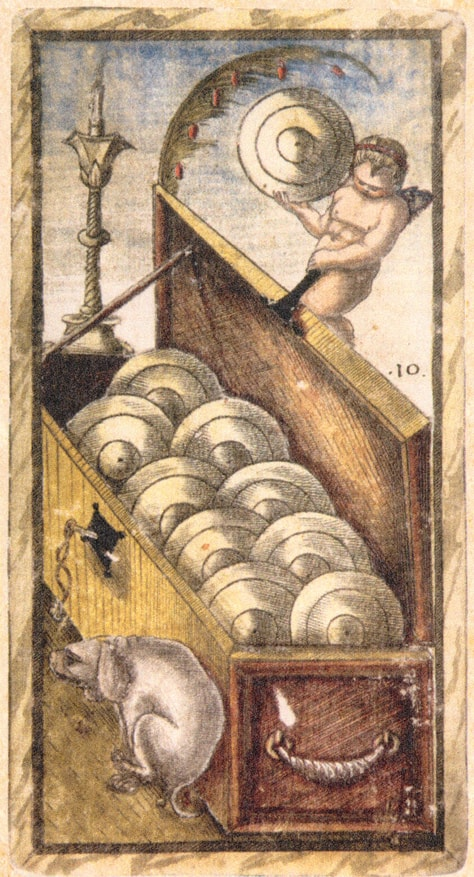
Ten of Coins

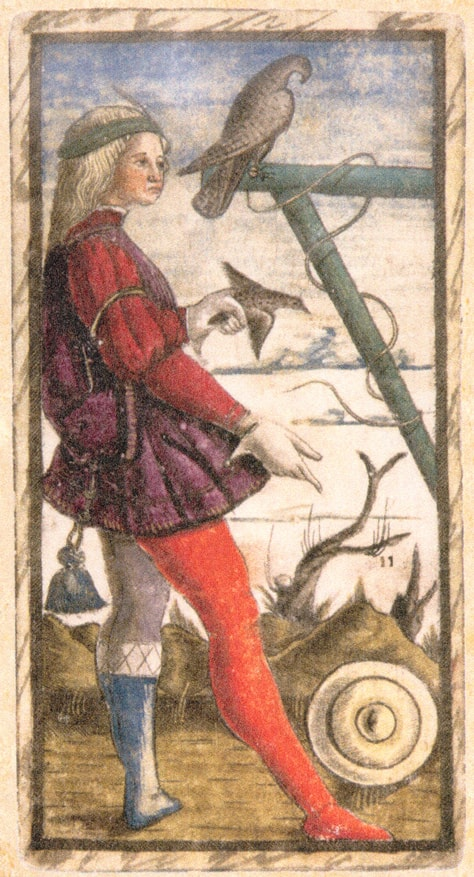
Knave of Coins

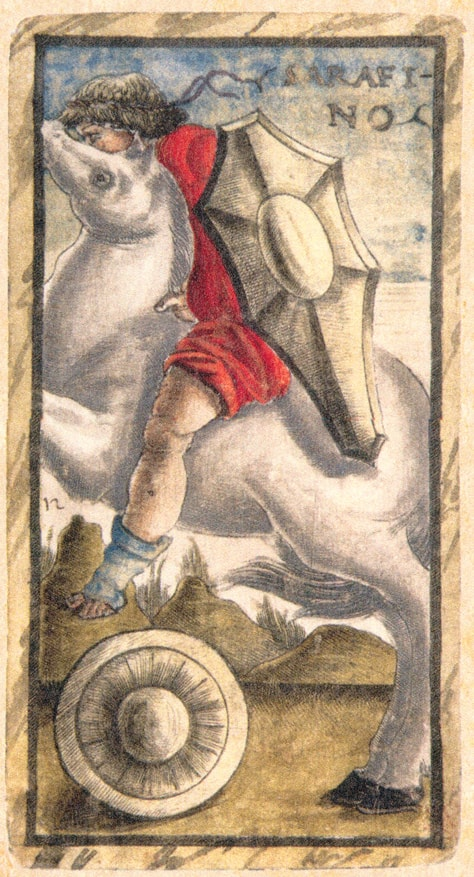
Knight of Coins:
Sarafino (Note: Their names, like that of Amun (C⚔), echo the theonyms Apollo and Serapis. Amun and Apollo are solar deities, while Amun and Serapis are Egyptian gods.)

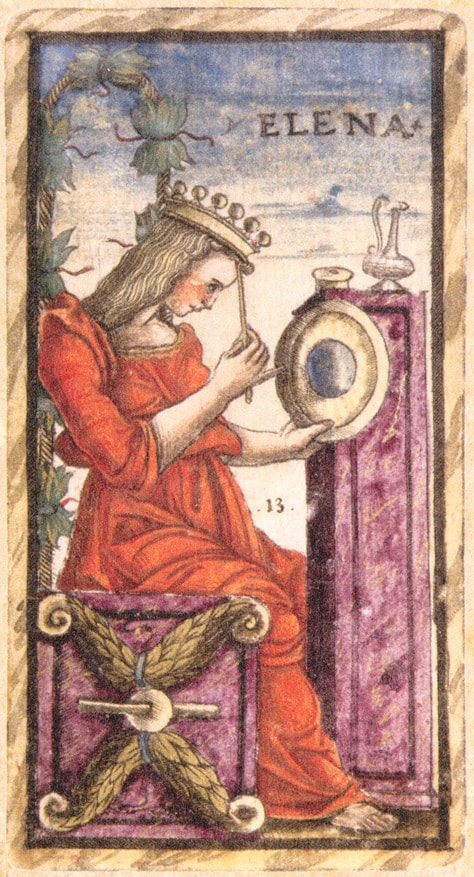
Queen of Coins:
Elena (Note: Mentioned on one of the face cards of the contemporary Boiardo–Viti tarot.)

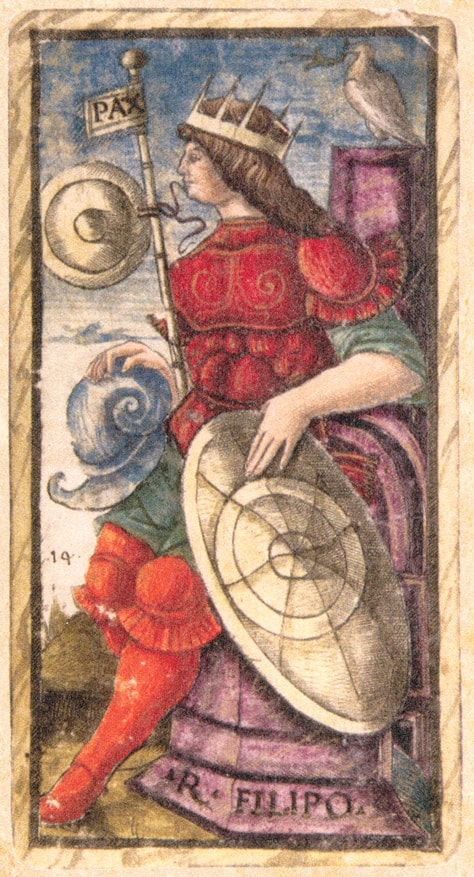
King of Coins:
R. Filipo

=== Batons ===
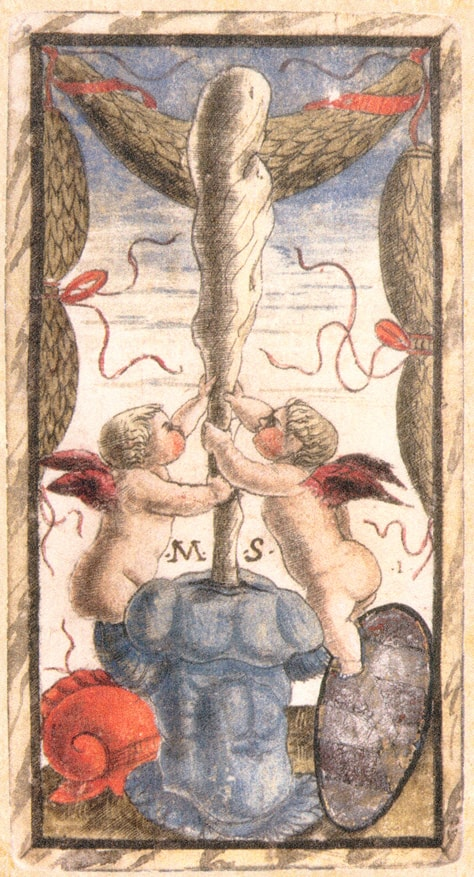
Ace of Batons

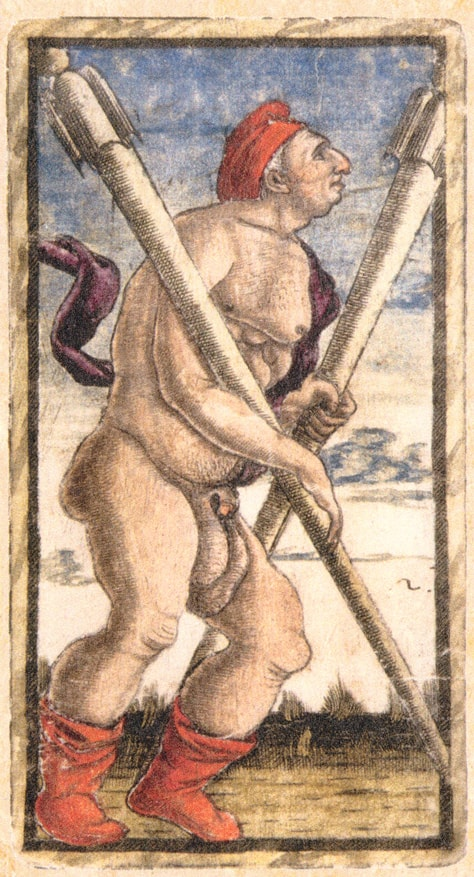
Two of Batons

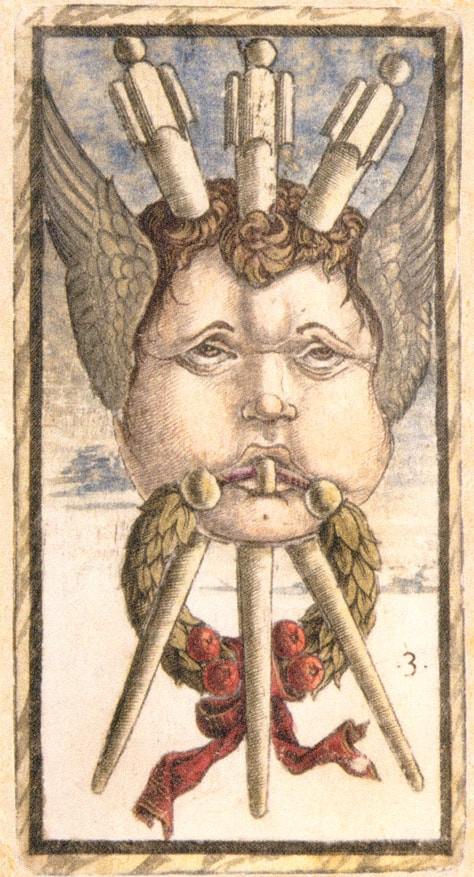
Three of Batons

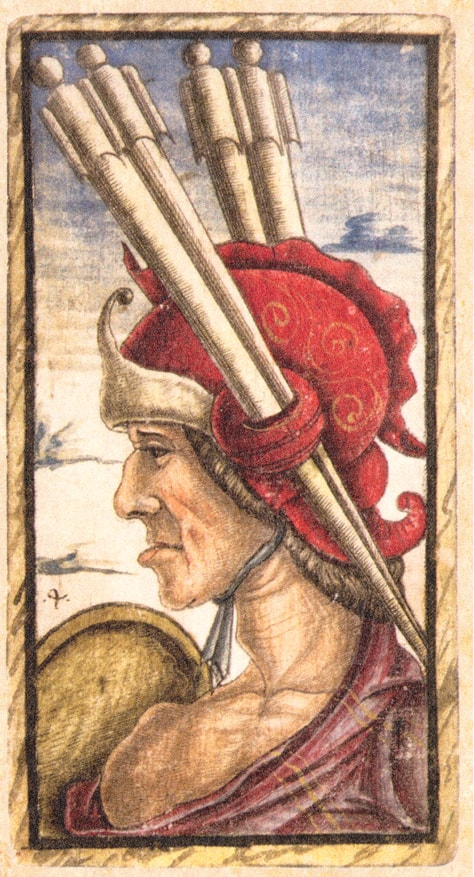
Four of Batons

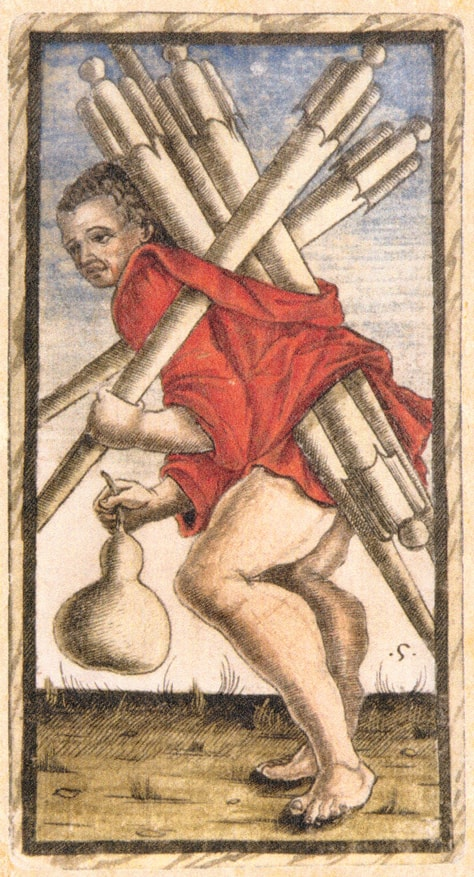
Five of Batons

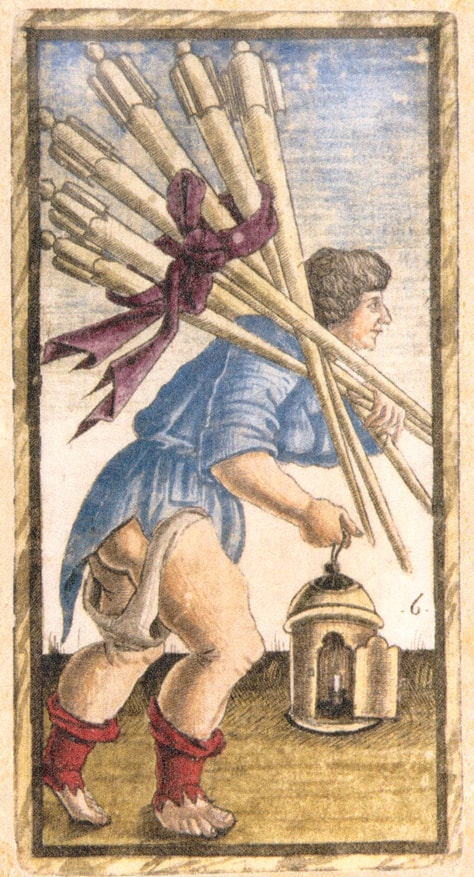
Six of Batons

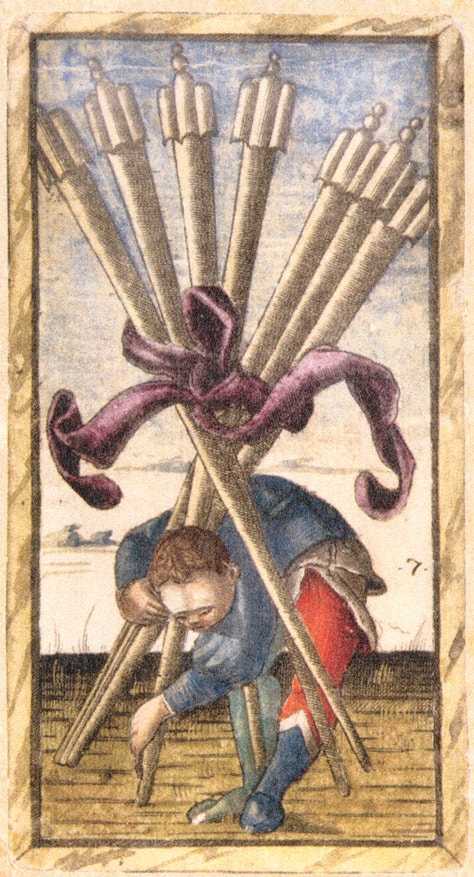
Seven of Batons

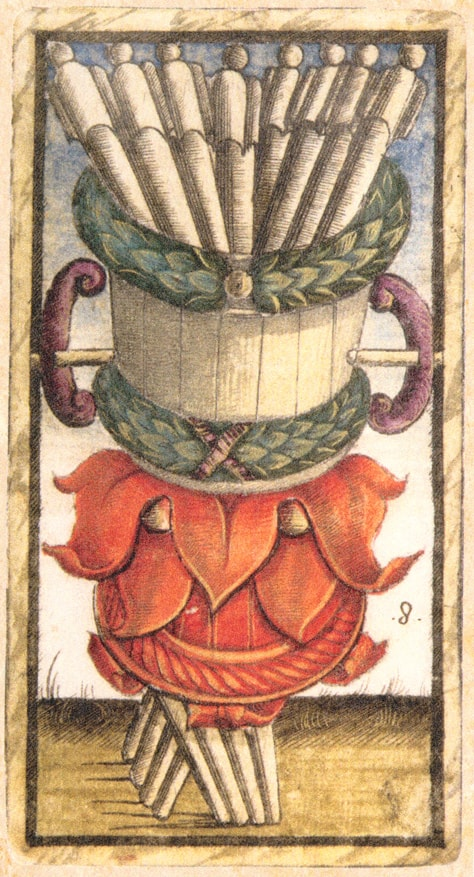
Eight of Batons

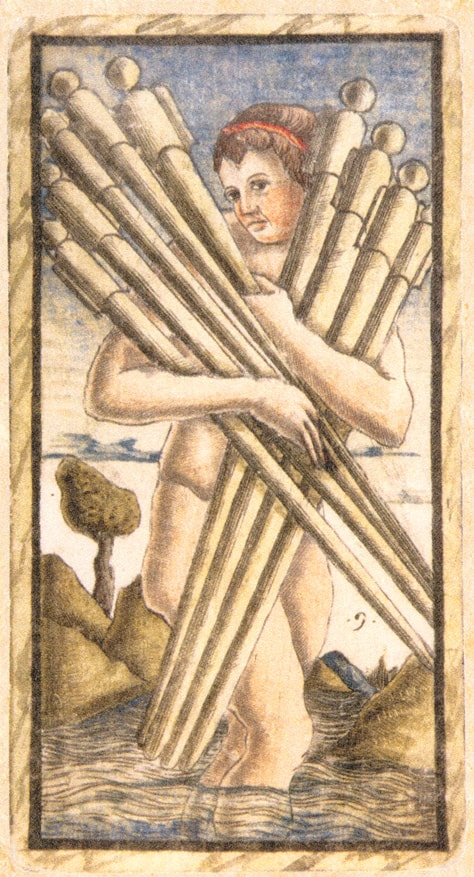
Nine of Batons

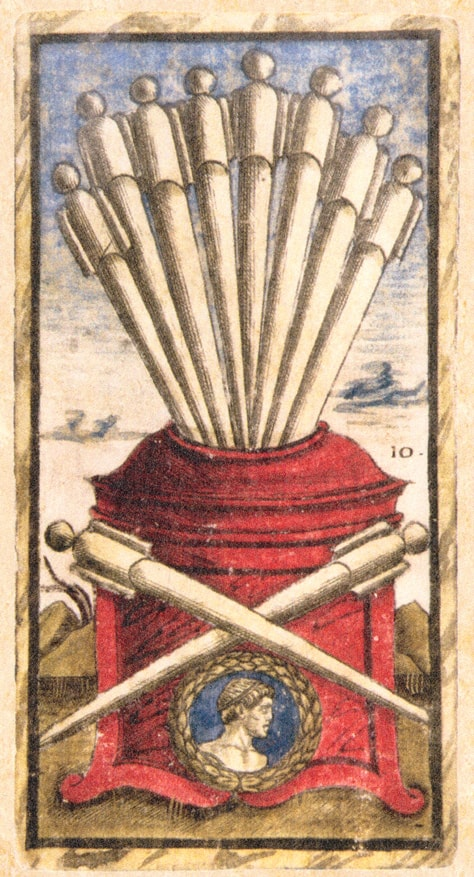
Ten of Batons

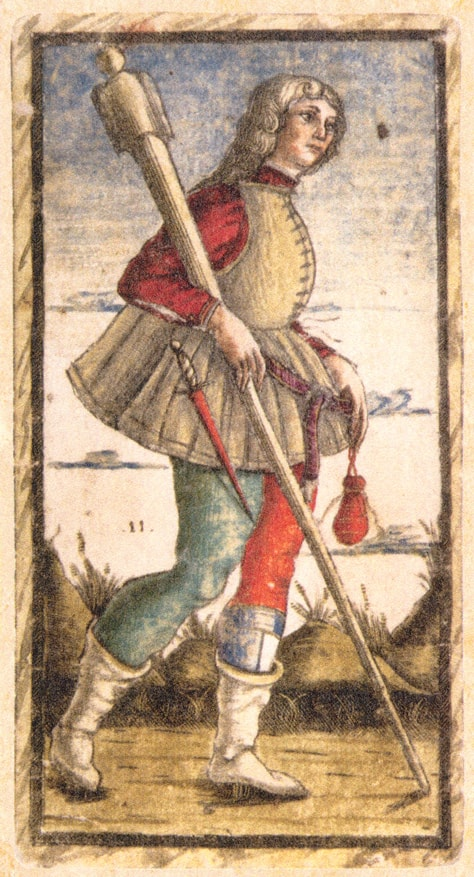
Knave of Batons

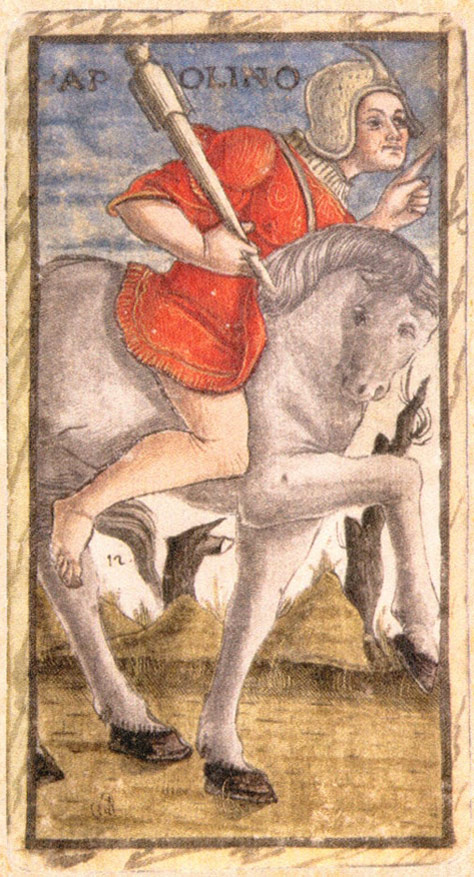
Knight of Batons:
Apolino (Note: The contemporary Boiardo–Viti tarot features Jason, the protagonist of his epic poem, Argonautica, as its knight of cups; see also Apollonius of Tyre.)

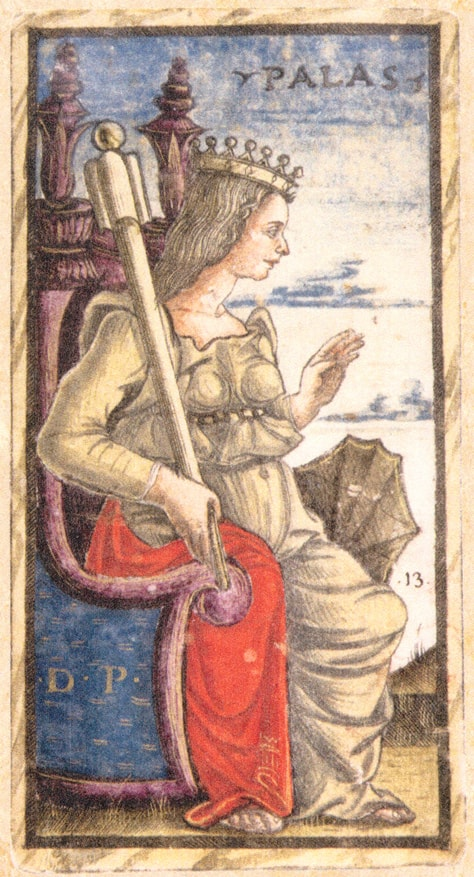
Queen of Batons:
Palas (Note: The queen of spades in French-suited playing cards, also found in da Tortona's deck.)

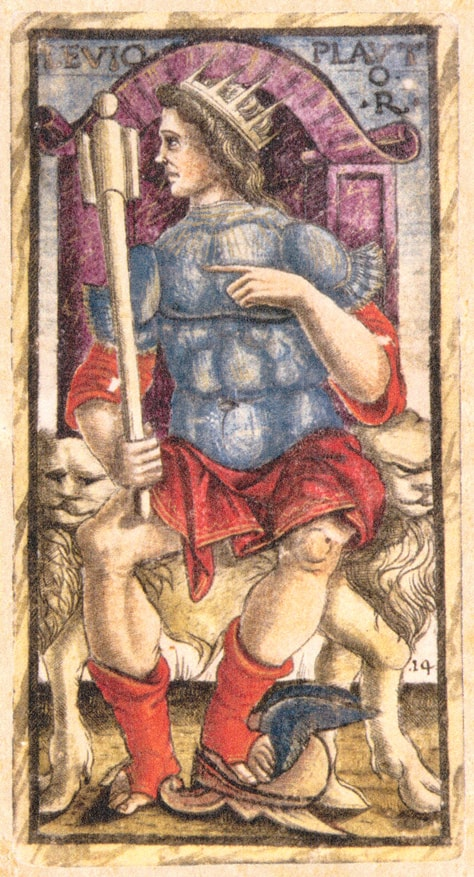
King of Batons:
Levio Plauto R.
(Note: Textual corruption of Rubellius Plautus, when rendered as rv[b]elio plavto, and written in a circular or annular fashion, thereby obscuring not only the difference between L and V, but also the text's exact starting position, the R. being then (mis)interpreted as a standalone abbreviation, as in Lucio Cecilio R. (K♥), where it stands for Rufus, or R. Filipo (K⬤), where it stands for Rex.)

=== Swords ===
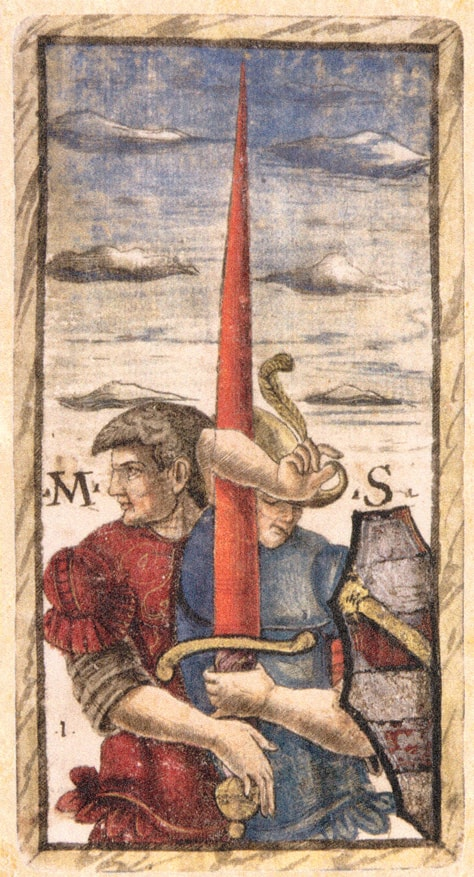
Ace of Swords

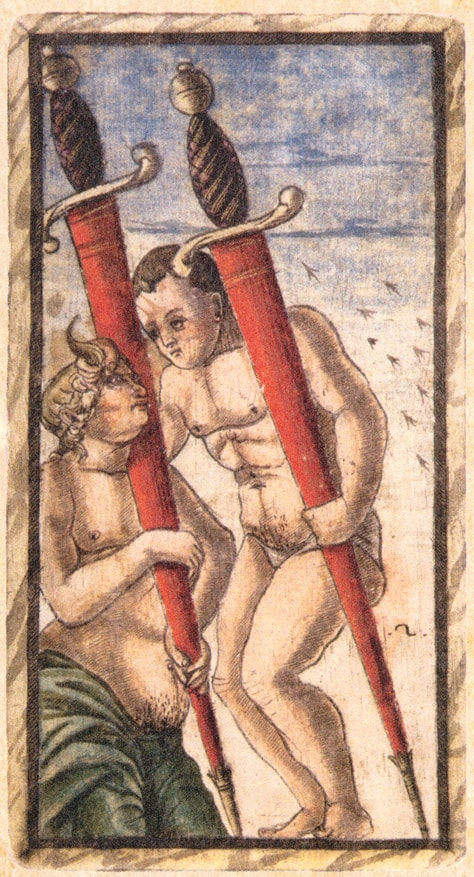
Two of Swords

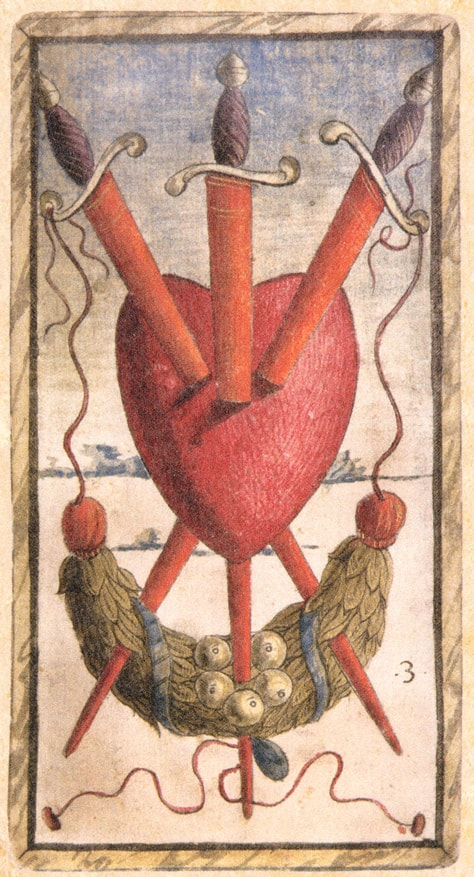
Three of Swords

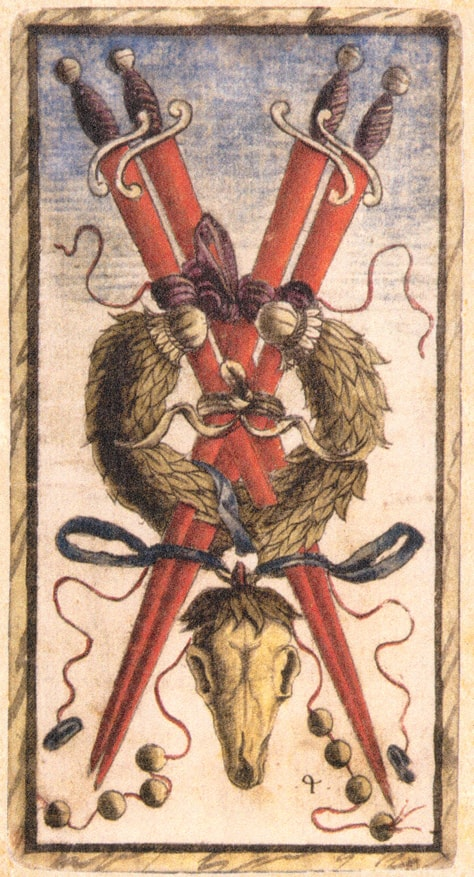
Four of Swords

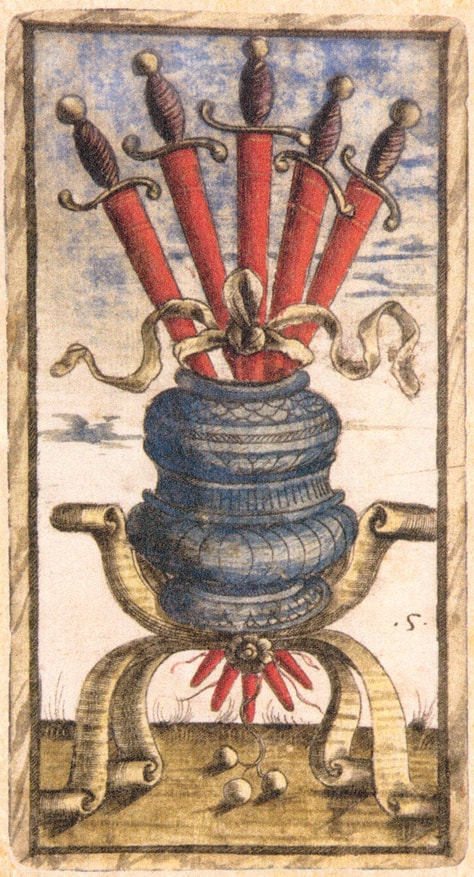
Five of Swords

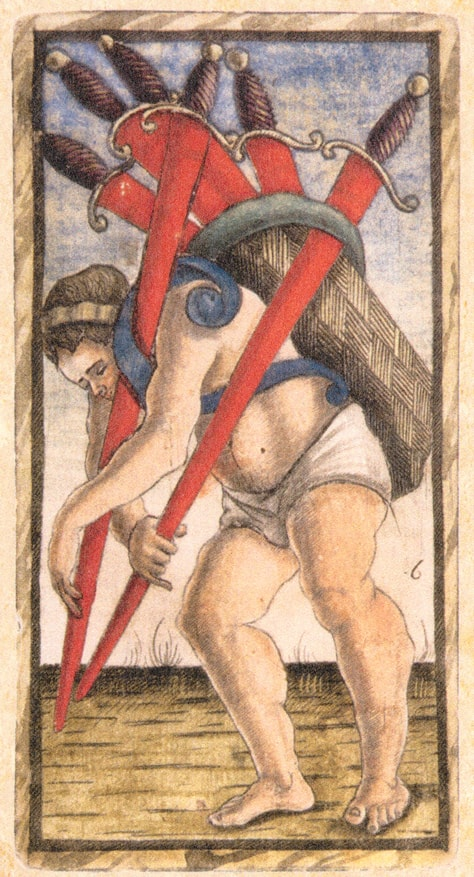
Six of Swords

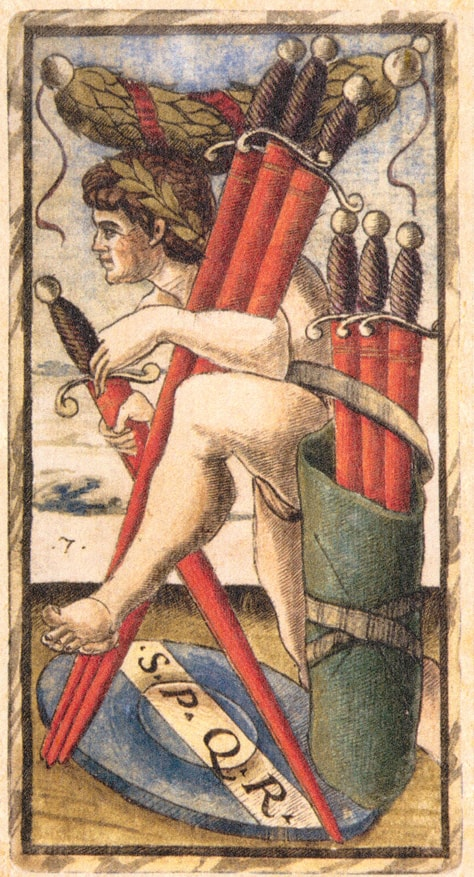
Seven of Swords

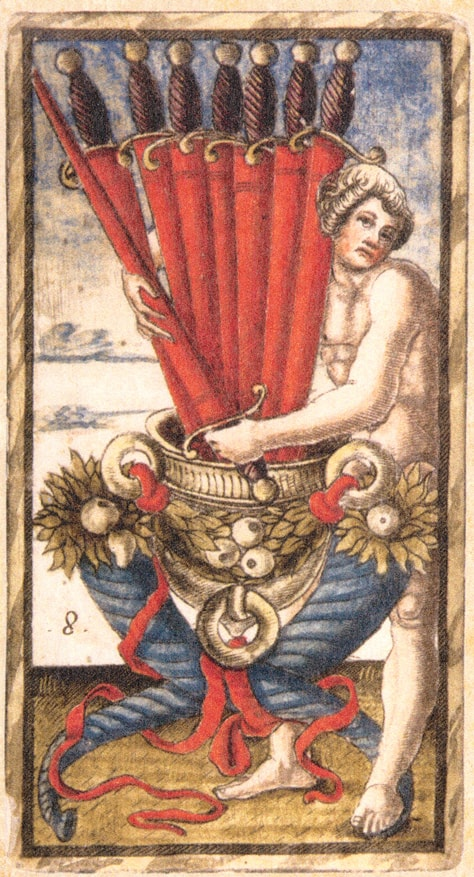
Eight of Swords

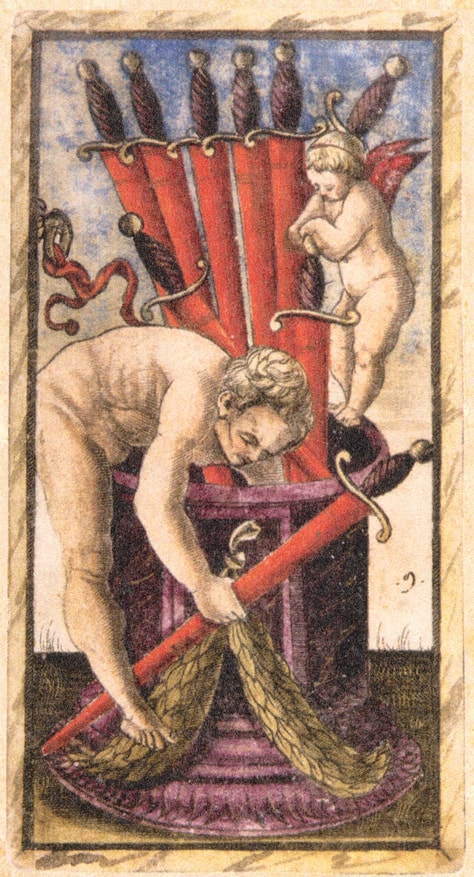
Nine of Swords

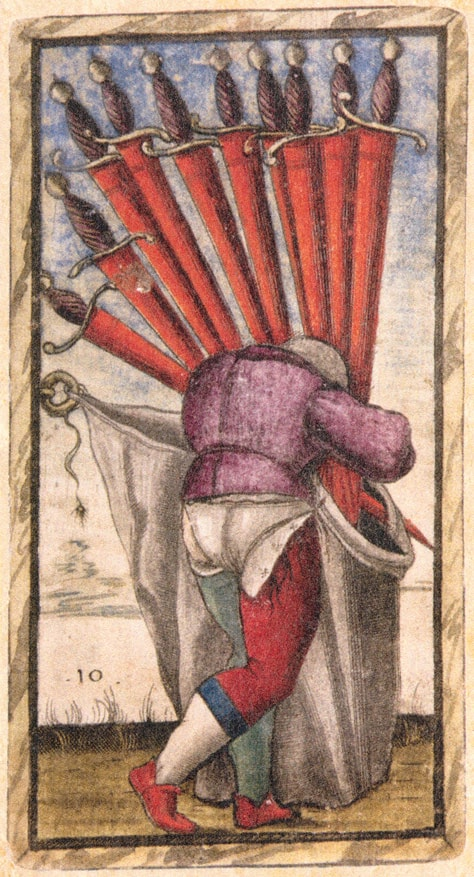
Ten of Swords

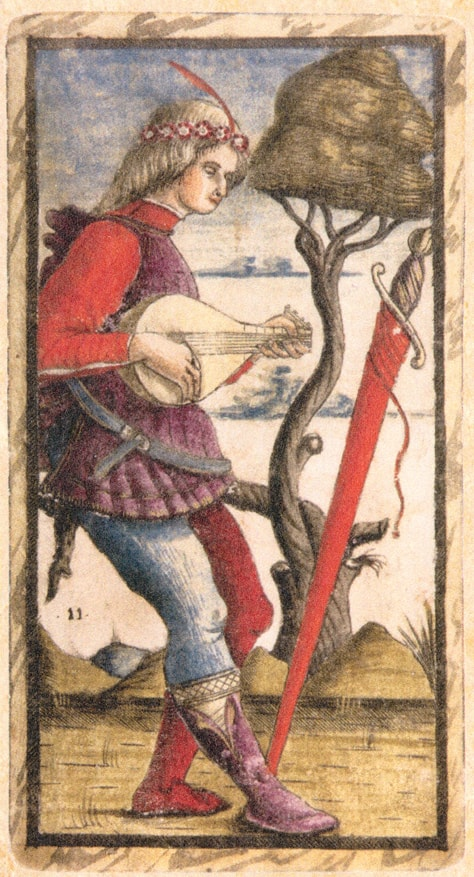
Knave of Swords

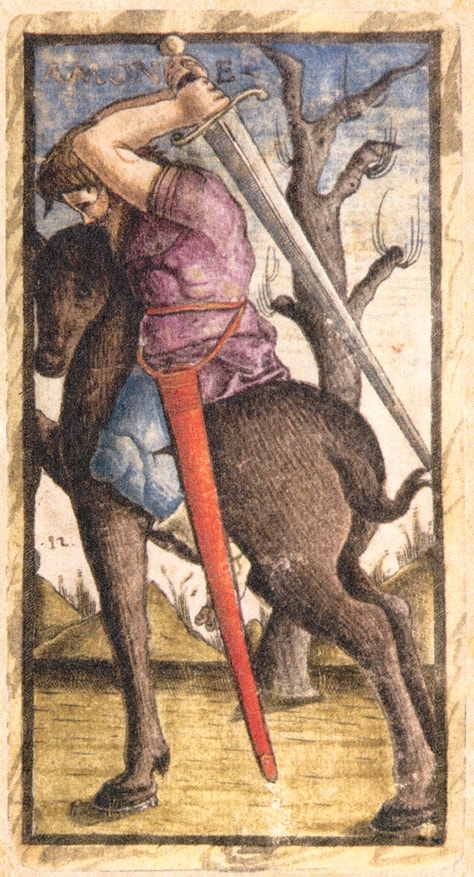
Knight of Swords:
Amone

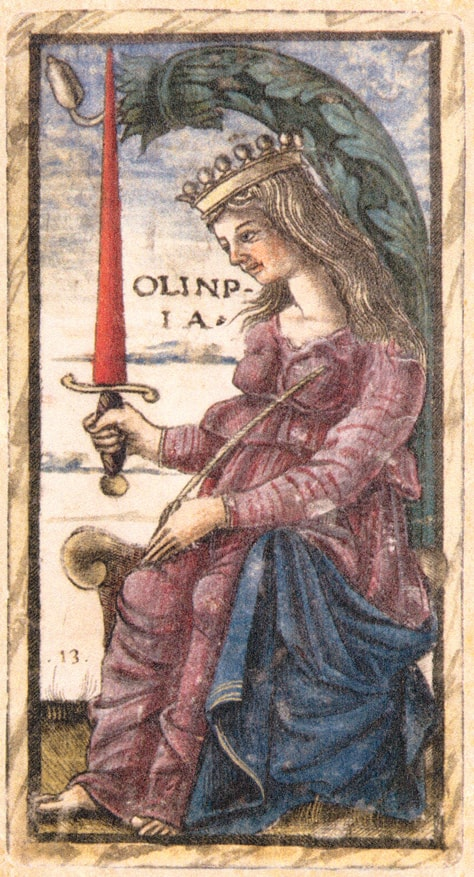
Queen of Swords:
Olinpia

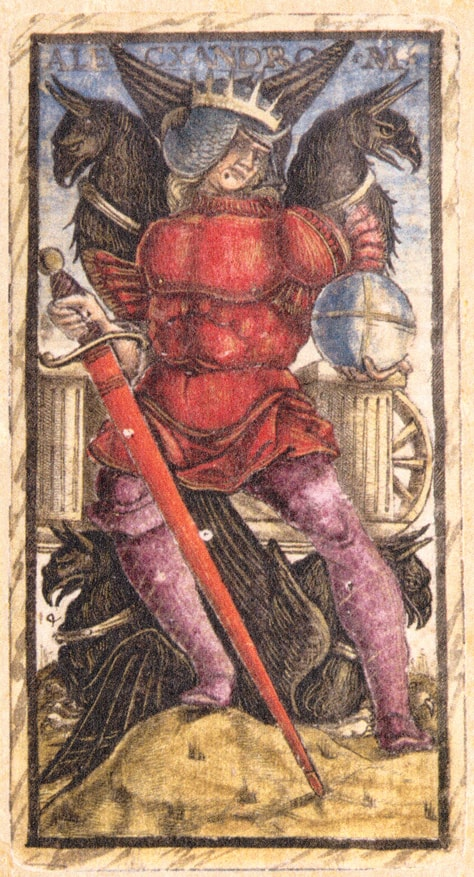
King of Swords:
Alecxandro M. (Note: The king of clubs in French-suited playing cards.)
