= Strength (tarot card) =

Tarot card of the Major Arcana

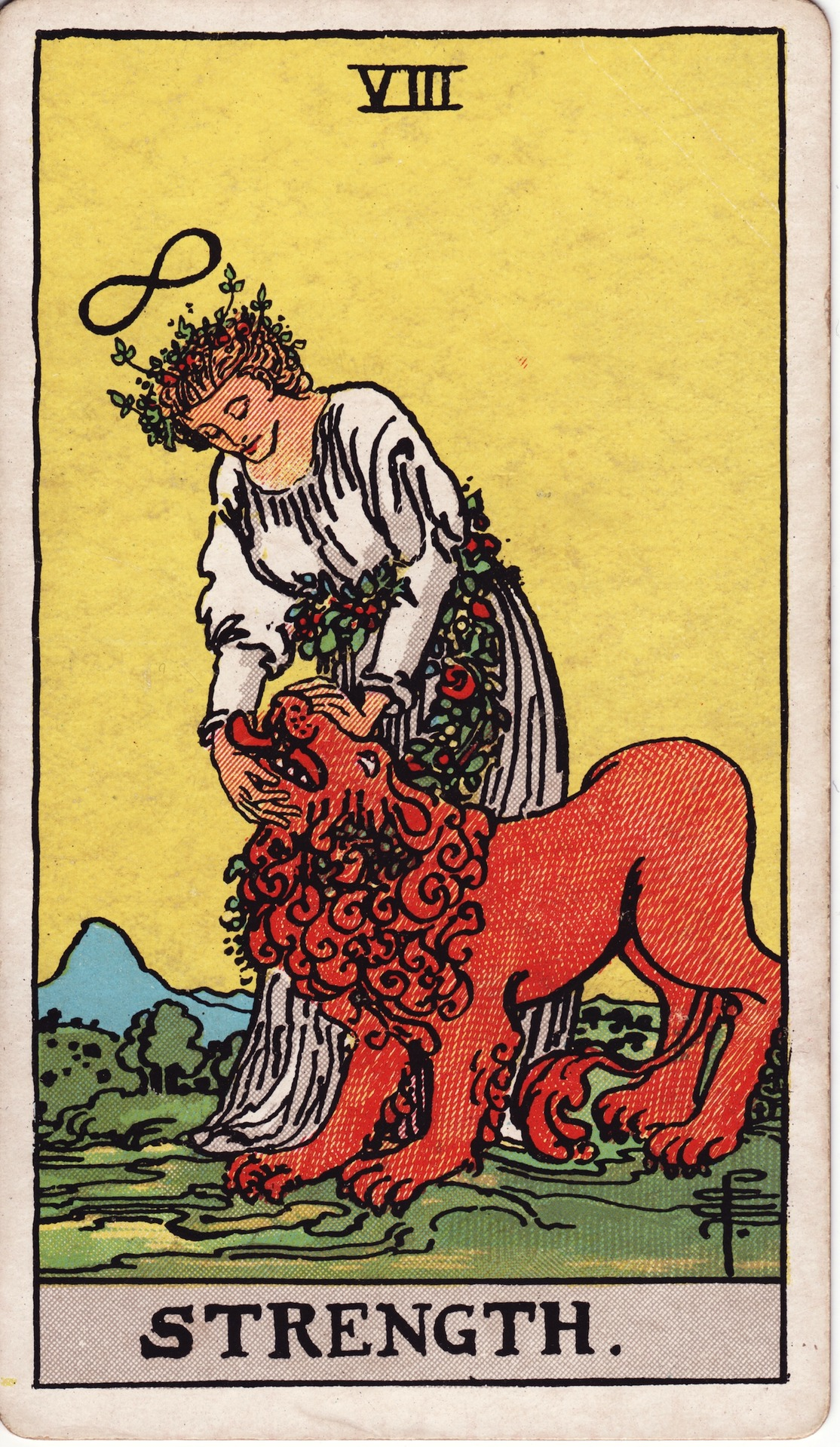
Strength (VIII) from the Rider–Waite tarot deck

Strength is a Major Arcana tarot card, and is numbered either XI or VIII, depending on the deck. Historically it was called Fortitude, and in the Thoth Tarot deck it is called Lust. This card is used in game playing as well as in divination.

== History ==
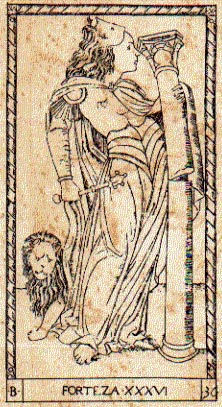
The "Forteza" card from the Tarocchi del Mantegna (c. 1470)

The Strength card was originally named Fortitude, and it accompanies two of the other cardinal virtues in the Major Arcana: Temperance and Justice. While the standard 22-card tarot did not typically include the virtue Prudence, the traditional Italian Minchiate deck expanded the selection to include cards for both cardinal and theological virtues.

Older decks had two competing symbolisms: one featured a woman holding or breaking a stone pillar, and the other featured a person, either male or female, subduing a lion. This Tarocchi del Mantegna card (image, right), made in Ferrara around 1470, illustrates both. The modern woman-and-lion symbolism most likely evolved from a merging of the two earlier ones.

== Description ==
The design of this card is fairly constant across tarot decks. The key characters are that of a woman and a lion, with the woman leaning over the lion. Many cards, including that of the Rider–Waite–Smith deck, have the woman clasping the lion's jaws. Some feature an Infinity symbol hovering over the woman's head. Other decks have the woman sitting upon the lion, or merely with one hand upon it. Some decks feature just one of the characters; flowers are often presented on this card.

According to Eden Gray, the lemniscate above her represents enlightenment and spiritual powers, whereas the lion represents animal passions and earthly cravings.

== Numbering ==
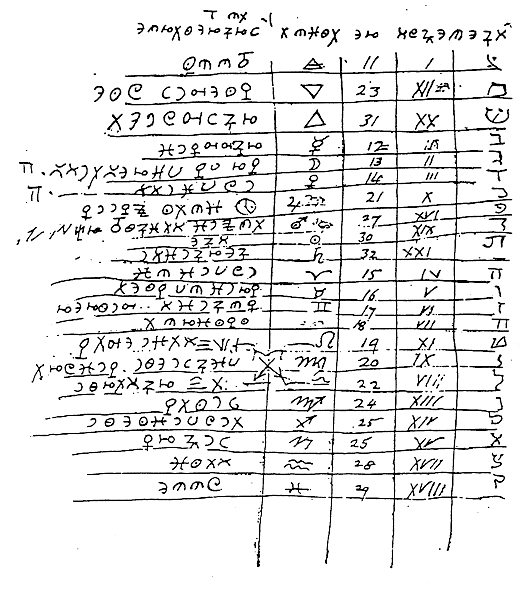
Folio 32 of the Cipher Manuscripts, suggesting the numbering switch for the Strength and Justice cards

Strength is traditionally the eleventh card and Justice the eighth, but the Rider–Waite–Smith deck switched the position of these two cards in order to make them a better fit with the astrological correspondences worked out by the Hermetic Order of the Golden Dawn, under which the eighth card is associated with Leo and the eleventh with Libra. This switch was originally suggested in the Cipher Manuscripts which formed the basis for the Golden Dawn's teachings regarding tarot and other subjects. Today many divinatory tarot decks follow this change, particularly in the English-speaking world. Conversely, while the late 15th-century Sola Busca tarot features a non-traditional trump sequence placing Nerone at position VIII, it does not depict a virtue corresponding to Strength.

== Interpretation ==
According to A. E. Waite's 1910 book Pictorial Key to the Tarot, the Strength card carries several divinatory associations:

8. FORTITUDE.—Power, energy, action, courage, magnanimity; also complete success and honours. Reversed: Despotism, abuse of power, weakness, discord, sometimes even disgrace.

In astrology, the Strength card is associated with the masculine, fixed-fire sign of Leo and its ruling planetary body, the Sun.
