= Justice (tarot card) =

Tarot card of the Major Arcana

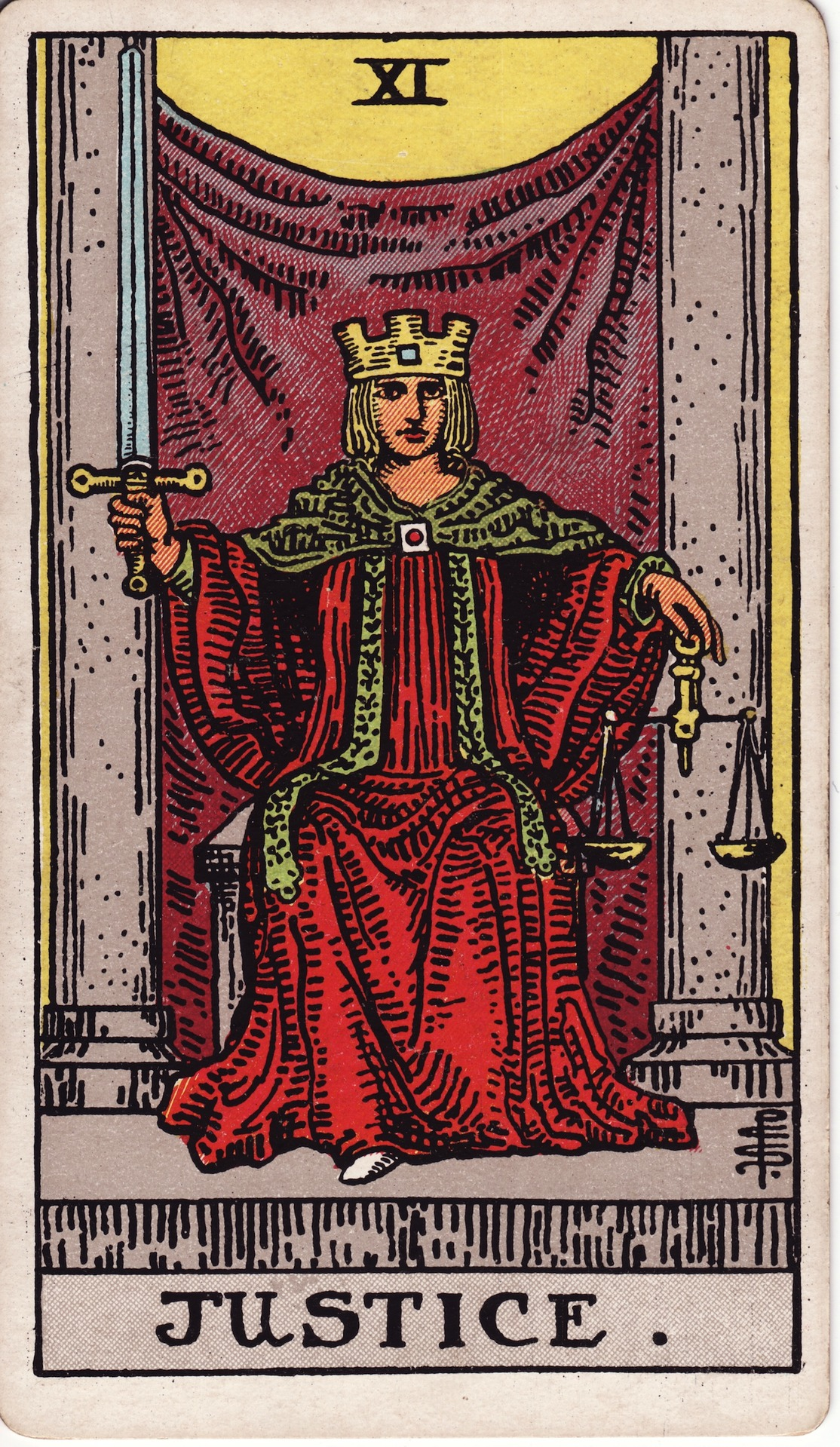
Justice (XI) from the Rider–Waite tarot deck

Justice is a Major Arcana tarot card, numbered either VIII or XI, depending on the deck, and used for both game playing and divination. Often depicted as a figure holding scales and a sword, Justice symbolizes fairness, truth, law, cause and effect, representing the need for objectivity, accountability, and balance.

== Description ==
Justice appears in the Major Arcana of early tarot decks, such as the Tarot de Marseilles, where it usually follows The Chariot as trump VIII (though some decks vary from this pattern), being accompanied by two other cardinal virtues, namely temperance and strength. Just as The Empress, The Emperor, and The Chariot resemble a queen, a king, and a horse riding knight (Note: One of the three original face cards, before being eventually replaced by the queen in French suits and Russian playing cards.) from the minor arcana, (Note: In the medieval Sola Busca tarot, all court cards, save for jacks, are explicitly labelled with additional meanings, usually taken from biblical or classical literature.) Justice is reminiscent of the queen of swords.

In the Rider-Waite tarot, the figure on the card holds a pair of golden scales in their left hand, symbolizing a logically sound, balanced, unbiased, rational decision; and a sword in their right hand, representing a sharp, decisive action required to cut through illusions.

== Interpretation ==
According to A. E. Waite's 1910 book Pictorial Key to the Tarot, the Justice card carries several divinatory associations:

11. JUSTICE.—Equity, rightness, probity, executive; triumph of the deserving side in law. Reversed: Law in all its departments, legal complications, bigotry, bias, excessive severity.

In astrology, the Justice card is associated with the planet Venus and the Libra zodiac sign.

== Numbering ==
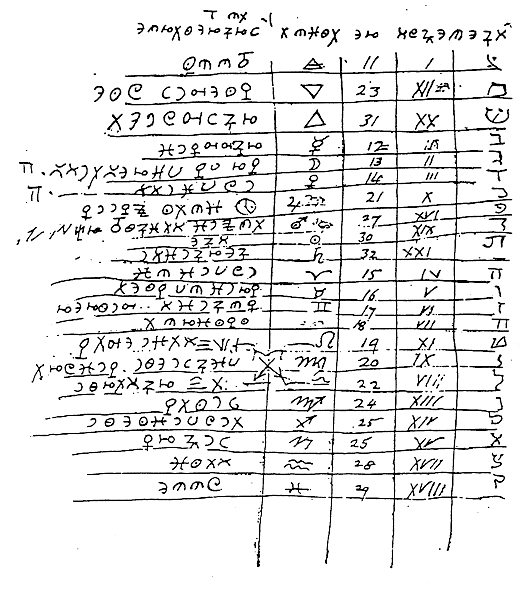
Folio 32 of the Cipher Manuscripts, suggesting the numbering switch for the Strength and Justice cards

Justice is traditionally the eighth card, and Strength the eleventh, but the influential Rider–Waite–Smith deck switched the position of these two cards in order to make them better fit the astrological correspondences worked out by the Hermetic Order of the Golden Dawn, under which the eighth card is associated with Leo and the eleventh with Libra. This switch was originally suggested in the mysterious Cipher Manuscripts, which formed the basis for the Golden Dawn's teachings regarding tarot and other subjects. Today, many divinatory tarot decks use this numbering, particularly in the English-speaking world.
