= Trinity (comic book) =

American comic book series

- Variant cover of Trinity (vol. 2) #1 (Nov. 2016), art by Jason Fabok and Brad Anderson

Publication information
- Publisher: DC Comics
- Schedule: Volume 1 Weekly: #1–52; Volume 2 Monthly: #1–22
- Genre: Superhero
- Publication date: Volume 1 June 2008–July 2009; Volume 2 November 2016–June 2018
- No. of issues: Volume 1; 52; Volume 2; 22, plus 1 Annual
- Main character(s): Superman; Batman; Wonder Woman

Creative team
- Written by: List: Kurt Busiek Fabian Nicieza Francis Manapul Rob Williams James Robinson
- Artist: List: Mark Bagley Scott McDaniel Tom Derenick Mike Norton Francis Manapul Clay Mann

Collected editions
- Volume 1: ISBN 1-4012-2277-3
- Volume 2: ISBN 1-4012-2318-4

Trinity is an American comic book series published by the publishing company DC Comics featuring the superheroes Superman, Batman and Wonder Woman. The first series was published weekly from 2008 to 2009. In 2016, a second monthly comic book series was launched by DC Comics.

== Development ==
Kurt Busiek first pitched the idea in 2006 to Dan DiDio following the announcement of 52. His initial pitch involved a 12-page weekly book in which the first 7 pages were focused on an ongoing story with Superman, Batman and Wonder Woman, and the remaining 5 pages were used to promote the rest of the line. The book was planned to follow up 52, but wound up being pushed back a year and developing into a full 22-page book with two stories, with the promotional idea being dropped.

The series was the "mystery project" which had been mentioned by Busiek previously and was his reason for leaving Aquaman. Like 52, also by DC Comics, the series would last for 52 issues and would be self-contained.

One of the differences between Trinity and earlier weekly comics is that it features two stories: the first, a 12-page lead story by Busiek and Mark Bagley, and the second, a 10-page backup by Busiek and Fabian Nicieza while Tom Derenick, Scott McDaniel, Mike Norton, and others, work on the art. The book marked Bagley's DC debut, after leaving a long tenure at Marvel Comics, which included 110 consecutive issues of Ultimate Spider-Man.

== Trinity (first series) ==
Superman, Batman, and Wonder Woman all experience the same dream of someone pleading to be let out. After determining that none of the other heroes are having them, they reason that someone is attacking them directly. They start to hear the voice in the waking world too.

At the same time, a mysterious man named Enigma approaches Morgaine le Fey, and tells her that the three heroes are a "trinity", keystones to the power of the universe, and convinces her to join him in taking their places by using a mystic ritual. The two conspire with Despero to replace the Trinity and take their power.

The Trinity take note of the strange occurrences and investigate, along with the Justice League, Justice Society of America and Gangbuster. The power of the Cosmic Egg draws dreamers from around the globe and infuses them with power, creating the Dreambound. Simultaneously, Morgaine prepares a massive reality-warping spell, creating a new world in which Batman, Superman and Wonder Woman never existed, and the Justice Society International patrols the world, banning all non-licensed heroes.

The villains come out of the ritual with godlike power, only to discover that Despero had been replaced from the beginning by Kanjar Ro. Also, a new Trinity has been formed, consisting of Black Adam, Tomorrow Woman, and Green Arrow. Amidst this, Krona escapes the Cosmic Egg and seeks the aid of the Controllers to contact the consciousness of the universe, but is betrayed and instead destroys their laboratory.

However, his is not the only case: reality seems to be unstable and some special people keep seeing visions of either how reality is supposed to be, or alternate worlds continually overlapping. Tarot goes to Opal City, where her cards show that she will be helped. There, she finds Charity O'Dare, a fellow mystic, and is instructed on the power of the Worldsoul, a bond linking a human to the living spirit of Earth. She realizes she needs to help fix the situation or she will die along with Earth. Morgaine and Enigma, bickering about their usage of power, agree to find Despero and complete the ritual. As a replacement for the Cosmic Egg's power, Morgaine finds a new source of energy - the Major Arcana of the Tarot.

Alfred realizes that he is part of a larger group, one needed to bring back the true Trinity. He gathers Dick Grayson, Lois Lane, Tom Tresser, and Kara In-Ze, and tells them that they were better people in another world. All agree to hear him out and find the last member of the cabal, Donna Troy, now a librarian in Virginia. Alfred and his group go to Happy Harbor and perform a ritual that transports them to the world inside the Cosmic Egg, which Krona devastated before Batman, Superman, and Wonder Woman stopped him and helped rebuild civilization.

Tomorrow Woman inadvertently creates rifts that threaten to destroy Earth. Morgaine plans to drain their power, but the Justice League stops her. Meanwhile, the Friends (Alfred's group) hear a story from the Pilgrims as to how Atmahn the Night Judge once rescued a child whose family had been killed, who became known as Rabat. Those who had rejected the order the Judge brought had formed the Laughing Chaos, who beat Rabat to death. The Friends realize it is a retelling of Jason Todd's death at the Joker's hands.

=== Major Arcana ===
To usurp the Trinity's power, the Dark Trinity form a coalition of villains according to the Major Arcana. The Justice Society International follows suit by combining forces with Barry Allen's underground organization of heroes to oppose them.

=== Dark Arcana ===
- Punch and Jewelee (The Fool) (later dropped in favor of the Joker)
- Enigma (The Magician)
- Morgaine le Fey (The High Priestess)
- Lady Shiva (The Empress)
- Khyber (The Emperor)
- Ra's al Ghul (The Hierophant)
- Catman and Catwoman (The Lovers)
- Zoom (The Chariot)
- Konvikt (Justice)
- Brainiac (The Hermit)
- Royal Flush Gang (Wheel of Fortune)
- Giganta (Strength)
- Gentleman Ghost (The Hanged Man)
- Solomon Grundy (Death)
- Prometheus (Temperance)
- Deathstroke (The Devil)
- Ultraman
- Owlman
- Superwoman
- Johnny Quick
- Power Ring
- Vandal Savage (The Tower)
- Cheetah (The Star)
- Scarecrow (The Moon)
- Sun-Chained-in-Ink (The Sun)
- Doctor Polaris (Judgement)
- Floronic Man (The World)
- The Dreambound (the Trans-Volitional Man/T.V.M., the Swashbuckler and Primat)
- Joker (second Fool of the Dark Arcana)
- Gorilla Grodd
- Eclipso
- Brimstone
- Parasite
- Queen Bee
- Shrapnel
- Mr. Nobody (considered a replacement for the Fool)
- Despero
- Clayface
- Kanjar Ro
- T. O. Morrow
- Amazo

=== Justice Arcana ===
- Plastic Man (The Fool)
- Phantom Stranger (The Magician)
- Raven (The High Priestess)
- Tomorrow Woman (The Empress)
- Aquaman (The Emperor)
- Lex Luthor (The Hierophant)
- Hawkman and Hawkgirl (The Lovers)
- Flash (The Chariot)
- Triumph (Strength)
- Space Ranger (The Hermit) (secretly Martian Manhunter)
- Gangbuster (Wheel of Fortune)
- Ragman (Justice)
- Deadman (The Hanged Man)
- Crimson Avenger (Death)
- Mister Terrific (Temperance)
- Booster Gold (The Devil)
- Cyborg (The Tower)
- Starfire (The Star)
- Black Orchid (The Moon) (replaced by Nightshade)
- Firestorm (The Sun)
- Green Arrow (Judgement)
- Geo-Force (The World) (replaced by Sandmaster)
- Flash
- Green Lantern
- Black Adam
- Skyrocket
- Atom Smasher
- Power Girl
- Brainwave
- Red Tornado
- Stargirl
- Nightshade (replacement for The Moon)
- Black Lightning
- Hourman
- Metamorpho
- Congorilla
- Sand (replacement for The World as Sandmaster)
- Vixen
- Citizen Steel
- Doctor Mid-Nite
- Black Canary
- Zatanna

== Trinity (second series) ==
Batman, Superman, and Wonder Woman on the cover of Trinity (vol. 2) #4 (February 2017), as they appear in DC Universe, art by Clay Mann and Brad Anderson

In 2016, as part of DC Rebirth, DC Comics launched a second Trinity comic book series featuring Superman, Batman, and Wonder Woman. The series was launched in September and ended in April 2018 with 22 issues and one Annual. Writers who worked on the series include Francis Manapul, Rob Williams, and James Robinson.

== Collected editions ==
=== DC editions ===
The first series has been collected into three trade paperbacks:

- Volume 1: collects Trinity #1-17 (416 pages)

- Titan Books edition (July 2009, ISBN 1-84856-283-7)
- DC Comics edition (2009-05-27, ISBN 1-4012-2277-3/ISBN 978-1-4012-2277-2)

- Volume 2: collects Trinity #18-35 (424 pages)

- Titan Books edition (September 2009, ISBN 1-84856-301-9)
- DC Comics edition (2009-08-26, ISBN 1-4012-2318-4/ISBN 978-1-4012-2318-2)

- Volume 3: collects Trinity #36-52 (424 pages)

- DC Comics edition (2009-10-14, ISBN 1-4012-2357-5/ISBN 978-1-4012-2357-1)

The second series includes:

- Trinity Vol.1 Better Together: collects Trinity #1-6.

- hardcover (2017-06-07)
- softcover (2017-12-13)

- Trinity Vol.2 Dead Space: collects Trinity #7-11.

- hardcover (2017-12-13)
- softcover (2018-06-20)

- Trinity Vol.3 Dark Destiny: collects Trinity #12-16, Annual #1.

- softcover (2018-07-25)

- Trinity Vol.4 The Search for Steve Trevor: collects Trinity #17-22.

- softcover (2018-12-05)

=== Planeta DeAgostini Comics editions ===
- Trinidad 1 De 3 (2009-05-??, ISBN 978-84-674-7941-6): Spanish version of Trinity (2008) Volume 1.
- Trinidad 2 De 3 (2009-12-??, ISBN 978-84-674-7942-3): Spanish version of Trinity (2008) Volume 2.
- Trinidad 3 De 3 (2010-10-??, ISBN 978-84-674-7943-0): Spanish version of Trinity (2008) Volume 3.

=== ECC Cómics editions ===
- Trinidad Parte 1 (2017-10-03, ISBN 978-84-17106-81-2): Spanish version of Trinity (2008) #1-13.
- Trinidad Parte 2 (2018-01-30, ISBN 978-84-17106-82-9): Spanish version of Trinity (2008) #14-26.
- Trinidad Parte 3 (2018-04-10, ISBN 978-84-17106-83-6): Spanish version of Trinity (2008) #27-39.
- Trinidad Parte 4 (2018-10-16, ISBN 978-84-17106-84-3): Spanish version of Trinity (2008) #40-52.
