= The Hermit (tarot card) =

Tarot card of the Major Arcana

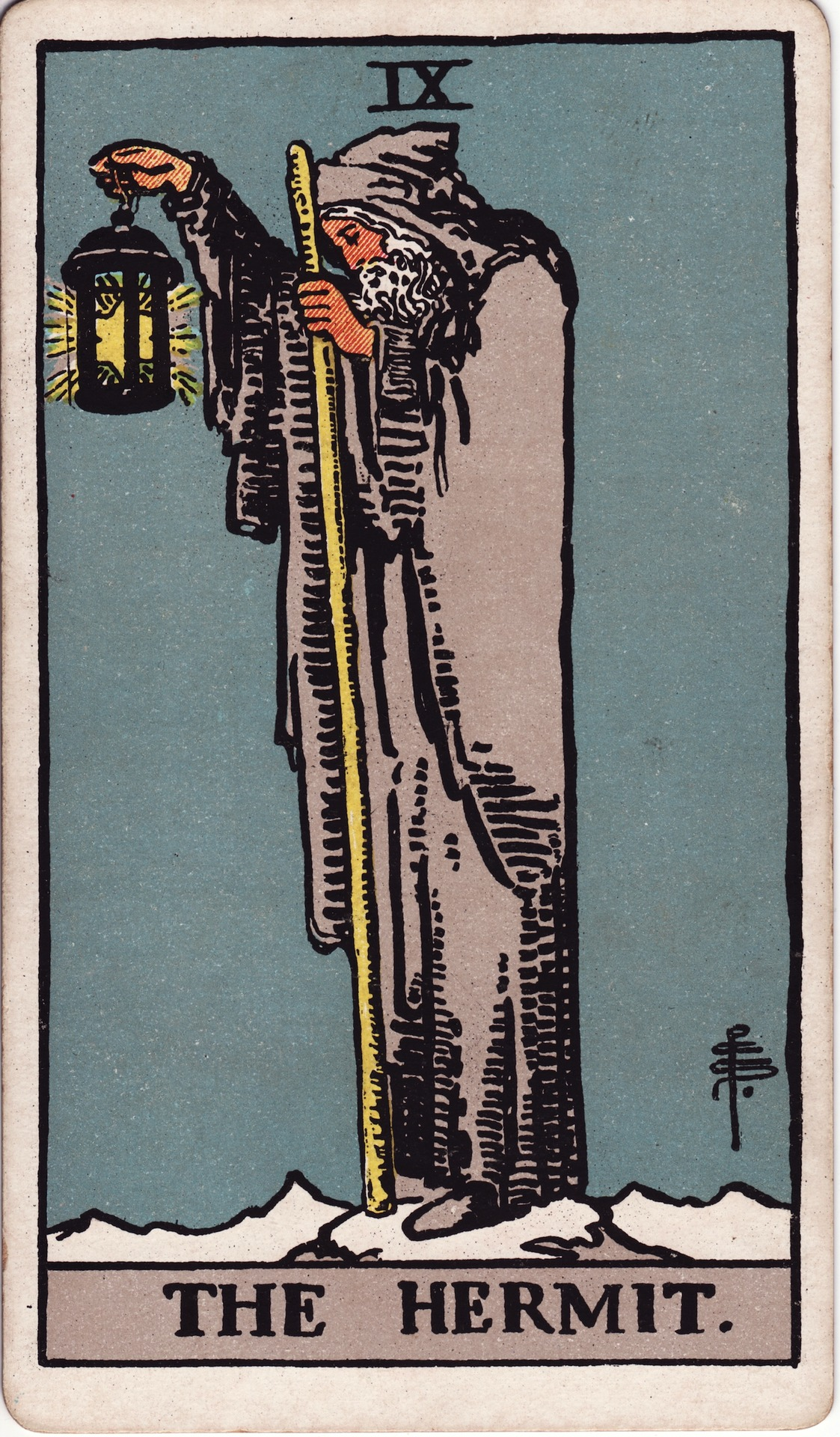
The Hermit (IX) from the Rider–Waite tarot deck illustrated by Pamela Colman Smith

The Hermit (IX) is the ninth trump or Major Arcana card in most traditional tarot decks. It is used in game playing as well as in divination.

== Description ==
The Rider–Waite version of the card shows an old hermit, standing on a mountain peak, carrying a staff in one hand and a lit lantern containing a six-pointed star in the other. In the background is a mountain range.

According to Eden Gray, his lantern is the lamp of truth, used to guide the unknowing, his patriarch's staff helps him navigate narrow paths as he seeks enlightenment and his cloak is a form of discretion.

== Interpretation ==
According to A.E. Waite's 1910 book Pictorial Key to the Tarot, the Hermit card carries several divinatory associations:

9. THE HERMIT. Prudence, circumspection; also and especially treason, dissimulation, roguery, corruption. Reversed: Concealment, disguise, policy, fear, unreasoned caution.

In astrology, the Hermit card is associated with the sign of Virgo and its ruling planet, Mercury.

== In popular culture ==
A version of Pamela Colman Smith's Hermit designed by Barrington Colby is depicted on the inner jacket sleeve of Led Zeppelin IV.

In Jojo's Bizarre Adventures: Stardust Crusaders, the manga by Hirohiko Araki the character Joseph Joestar uses a stand named Hermit Purple named after the Hermit card.

== Examples ==
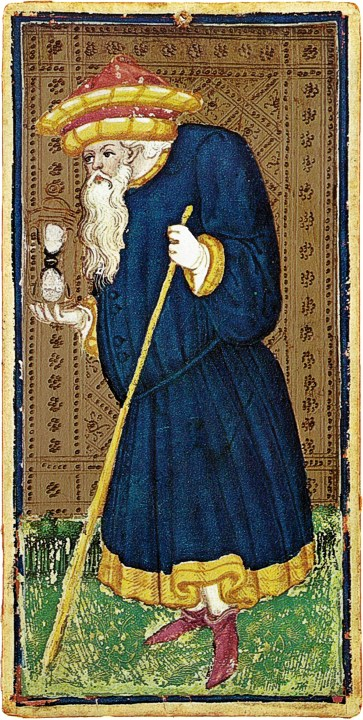
Pierpont Morgan Bergamo (15th century)

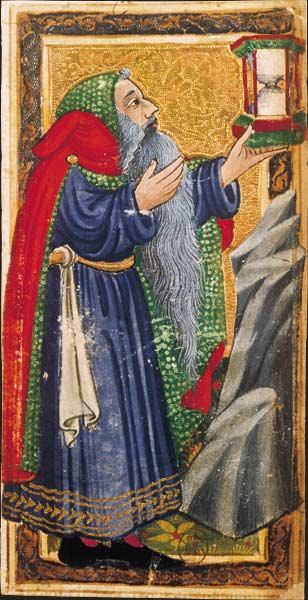
Charles VI (or Gringonneur) (15th century)

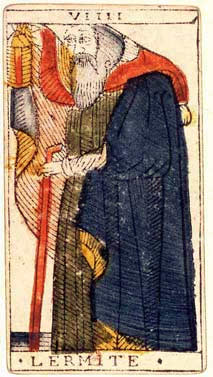
Jean Dodal Marseilles (1701–1715)

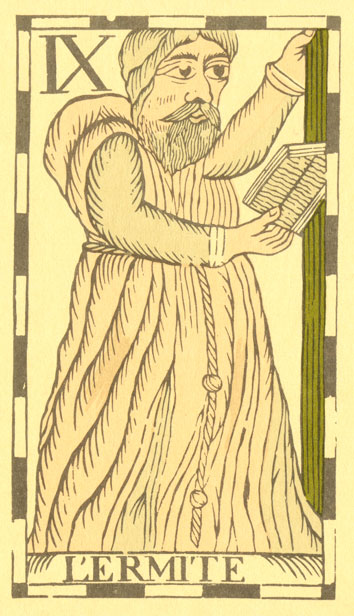
Vandenborre (1780)

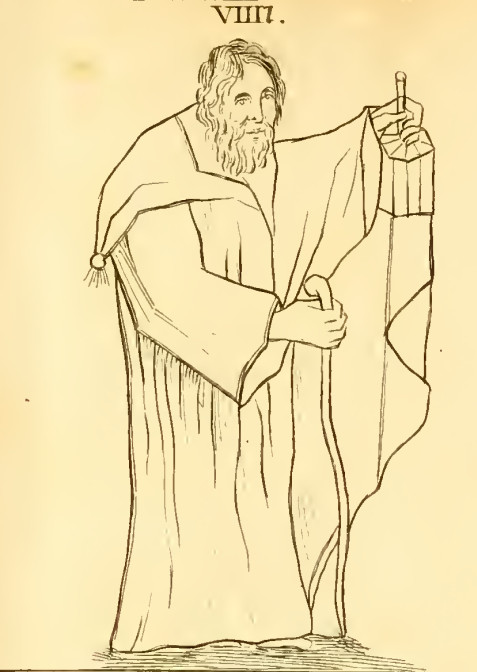
Court de Gébelin (1781)

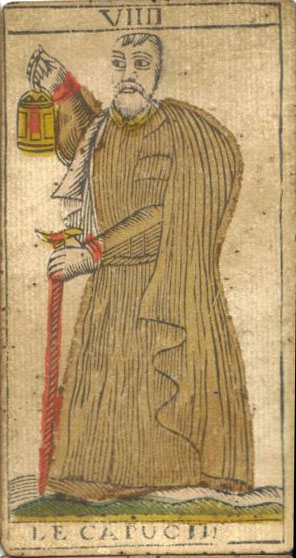
Renault (1820–1830)

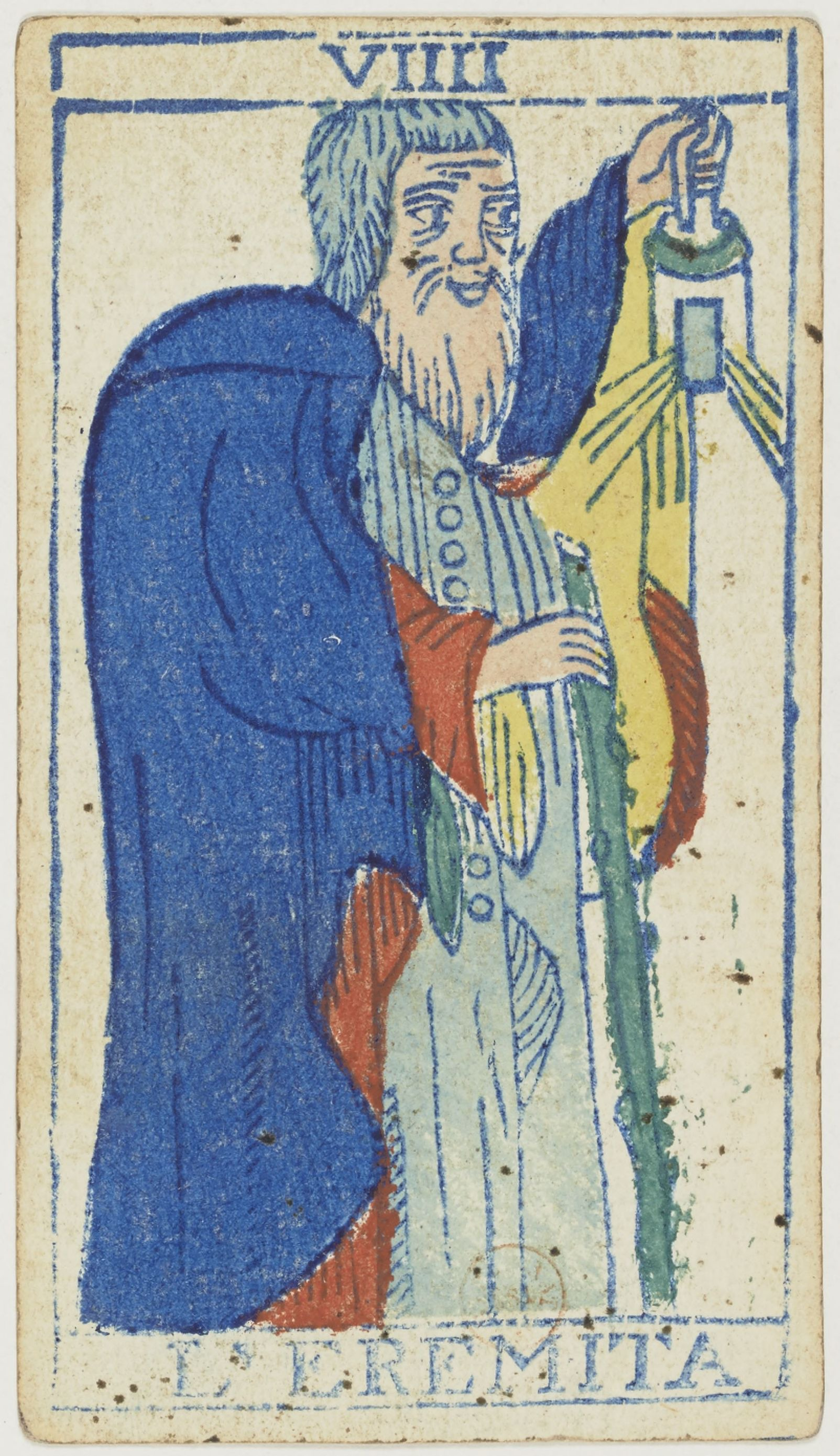
Piedmontese (1865)

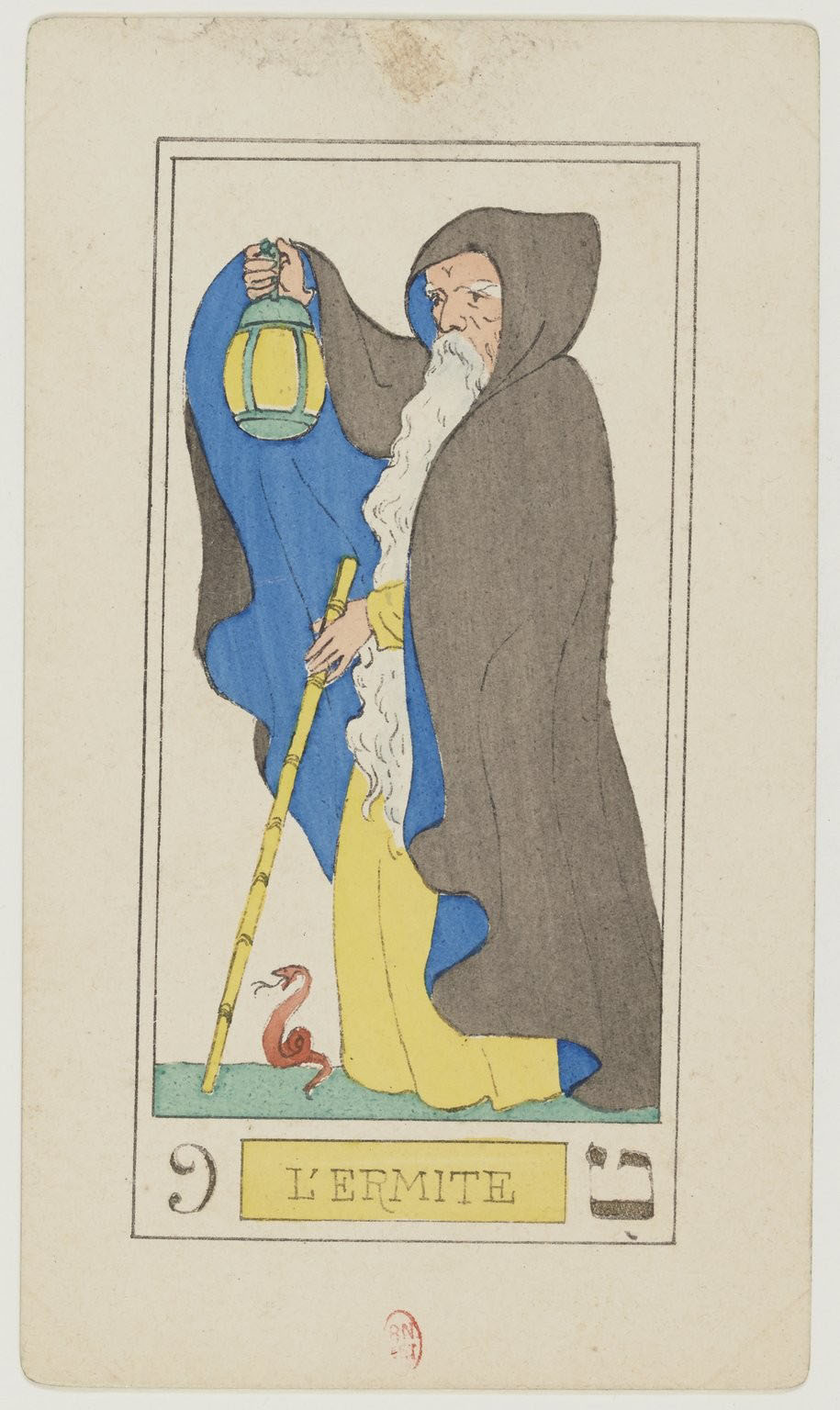
Oswald Wirth (1889)

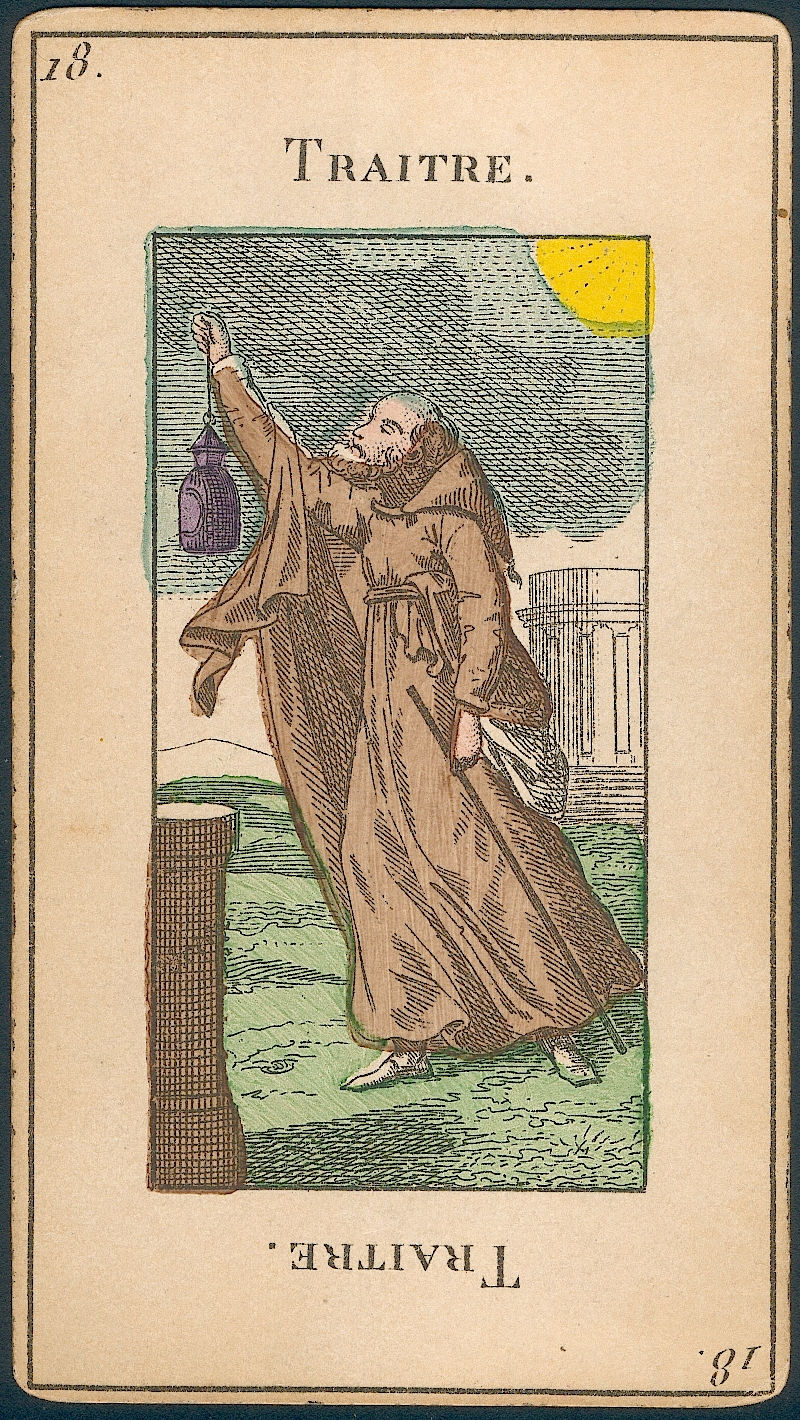
Grand Etteilla (1890)

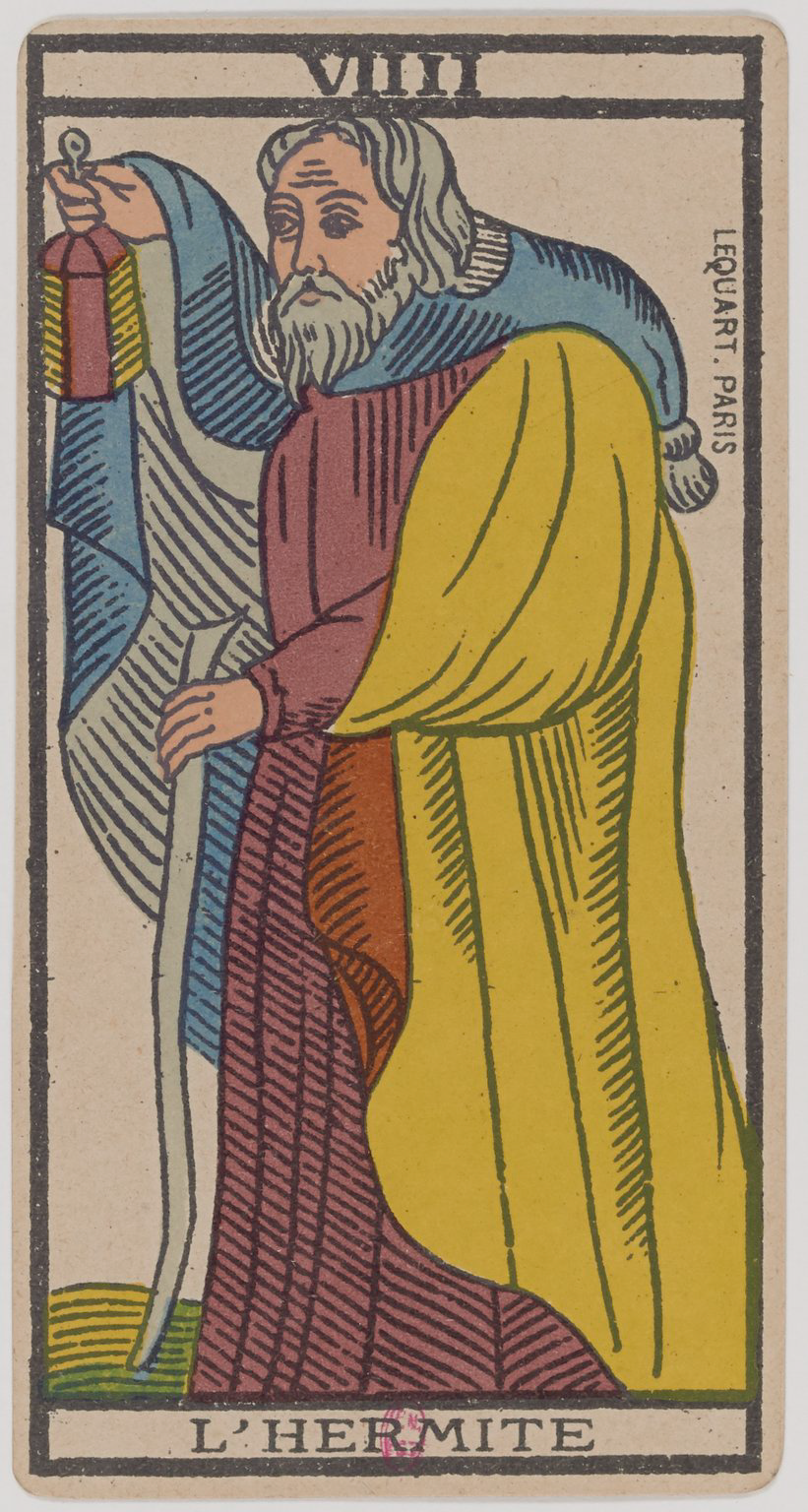
Lequart Marseilles (1890)

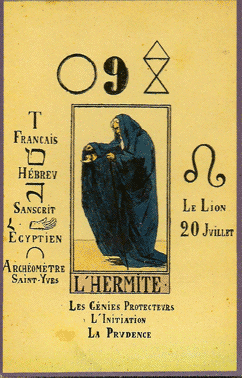
Papus (1909)

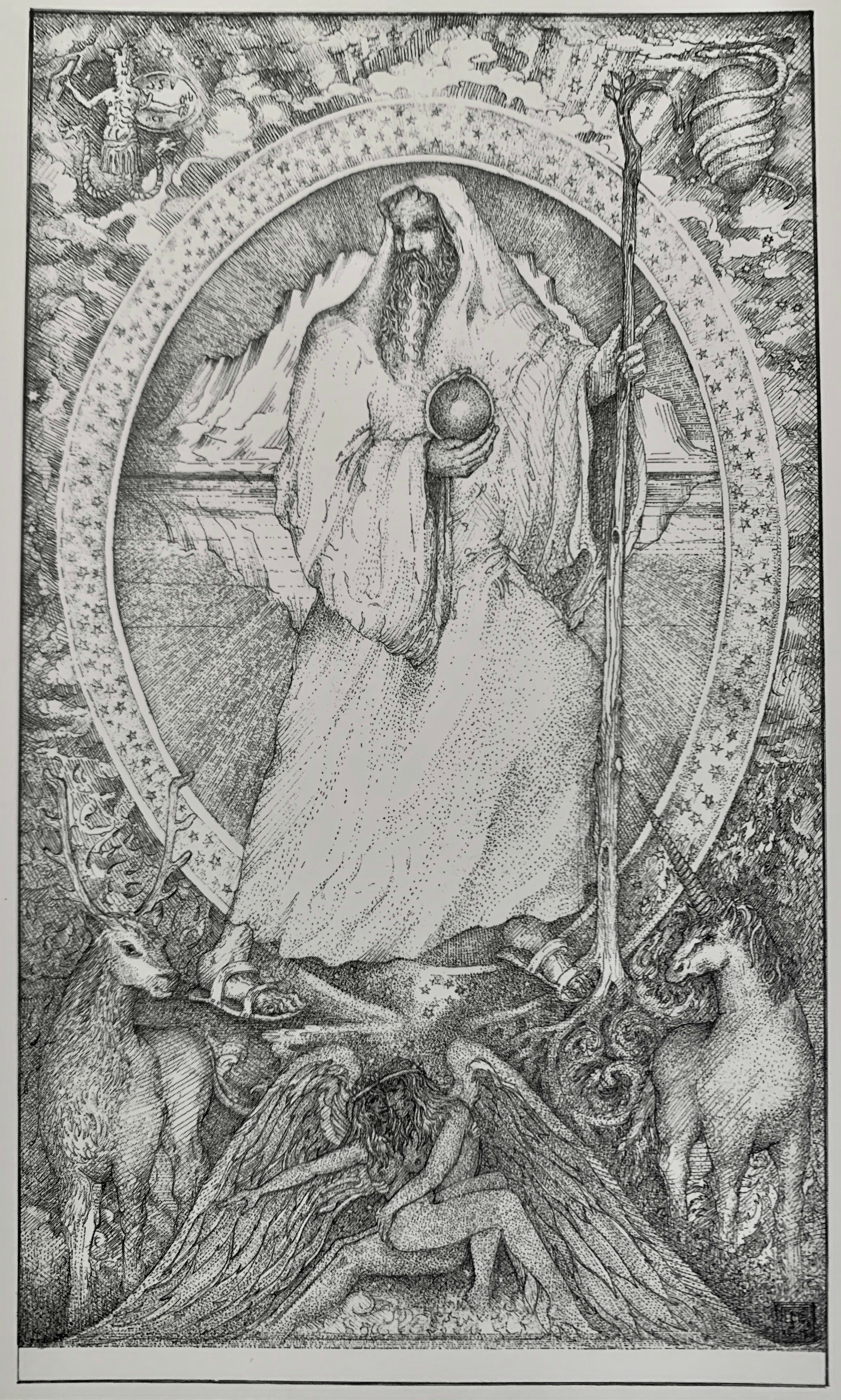
Tarot ReVisioned (2003)
