= Major Arcana =

Trump cards of tarot decks

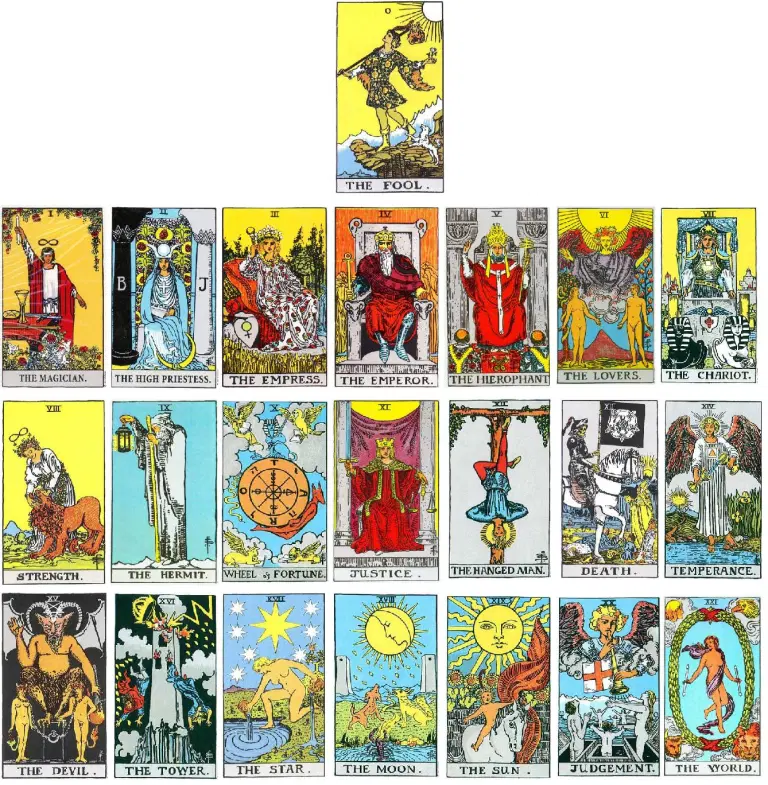
The Major Arcana in the Rider–Waite Tarot deck

The Major Arcana are the named cards in a cartomantic tarot pack. There are usually 22 such cards in a standard 78-card pack, typically numbered from 0 to 21 (or 1 to 21, with the Fool numbered as 0). Although the cards correspond to the trump cards of a pack used for playing tarot card games, the term 'Major Arcana' is rarely used by players and is typically associated exclusively with use for divination.

The Major Arcana are complemented by the Minor Arcana—the 56 unnamed cards of the tarot deck, which more directly correspond to the contemporary standard 52-card deck.

== History ==
Prior to the 17th century, tarot cards were solely used for playing games and the Fool and 21 trumps had simple allegorical or esoteric meaning, mostly originating in elite ideology in the Italian courts of the 15th century when it was invented. The occult significance began to emerge in the 18th century, when Antoine Court de Gébelin, a Swiss clergyman and Freemason, published two essays on Tarot in his Le Monde Primitif (The Primeval World), a never-completed encyclopedia. In the first essay, "Du Jeu des Tarots" (The Game of Tarots), Court de Gébelin assigned Egyptian, kabbalistic, and divine significance to the tarot trumps.

Etteilla created a method of divination using tarot; Éliphas Lévi worked to break away from the Egyptian nature of the divinatory tarot, bringing it back to the Tarot de Marseille, creating a "tortuous" kabbalistic correspondence, and even suggested that the Major Arcana represent stages of life. Marquis Stanislas de Guaita established the Major Arcana as an initiatory sequence to be used to establish a path of spiritual ascension and evolution. In 1980 Sallie Nichols, a Jungian psychologist, wrote of the tarot as having deep psychological and archetypal significance, even encoding the entire process of Jungian individuation into the tarot trumps.

These various interpretations of the Major Arcana developed in stages, all of which continue to exert significant influence on practitioners' explanations of the Major Arcana.

== List of the Major Arcana ==
Like the early Italian-suited packs on which they were originally based, in a cartomantic pack each Major Arcanum depicts a scene, mostly featuring a person or several people, with many symbolic elements. In many decks, each has a number (usually in Roman numerals) and a name, though not all decks have both, and some have only a picture.

Every tarot deck is different and carries a different connotation with the art, however most symbolism remains the same. The earliest, pre-cartomantic, decks bore unnamed and unnumbered pictures on their trionfi or trumps (probably because a great many of the people using them at the time were illiterate), and the order of cards was not standardized.

Strength is traditionally the eleventh card and Justice the eighth, but the influential Rider–Waite Tarot switched the position of these two cards in order to make them a better fit with the astrological correspondences worked out by the Hermetic Order of the Golden Dawn, under which the eighth card is associated with Leo and the eleventh with Libra. Today many decks use this numbering, particularly in the English-speaking world.

No.	Tarot de Marseille	Court de Gébelin	Rider–Waite	Etteilla	Paul Christian	Oswald Wirth	Golden Dawn	Book of Thoth (Crowley)
0 (Note: often unnumbered)	The Fool	The Fool	The Fool	Folly	The Crocodile (Note: Christian, following Lévi, placed his "Crocodile" between Arcanum XX and Arcanum XXI.)	The Fool (Note: Wirth typically placed his unnumbered "Fool" last, but depicted the penultimate Hebrew letter shin (ש) on the card, following Lévi's arrangement of Arcanum 0 between Arcanum XX and Arcanum XXI.)	The Fool	The Fool
I	The Juggler	The Magician ("The Mountebank", "The Thimblerigger")	The Magician	Illness, Illness	The Magus	The Magician	The Magician	The Magus (Note: Some versions of Crowley's tarot include two additional variants of this arcanum with different artwork.)
II	The Popess	The High Priestess	The High Priestess	Etteilla, Female Querent	The Gate of the Sanctuary (of the occult Sanctuary)	The Priestess	The High Priestess	The Priestess
III	The Empress	The Empress ("Queen")	The Empress	Night, Day	Isis-Urania	The Empress	The Empress	The Empress
IV	The Emperor	The Emperor ("King")	The Emperor	Support, Protection	The Cubic Stone	The Emperor	The Emperor	The Emperor
V	The Pope	The Hierophant ("High Priest")	The Hierophant	Marriage, Union	The Master of the Mysteries (of the Arcana)	The Pope	The Hierophant	The Hierophant
VI	The Lovers	Marriage	The Lovers	(none) (Note: But note that Revak identifies a single card labeled "1. Etteilla/Male Querent" that does not correspond to any in the Tarot de Marseille.)	The Two Roads	The Lovers	The Lovers	The Lovers
VII	The Chariot	Osiris Triumphant	The Chariot	Dissension	The Chariot of Osiris	The Chariot	The Chariot	The Chariot
VIII	Justice	Justice	Strength	Justice, Jurist	Themis ("The Scales and Blade")	Justice	Strength	Adjustment
IX	The Hermit	The Wise Man ("The Sage", "The Seeker of Truth and Justice")	The Hermit	Traitor	The Veiled Lamp	The Hermit	The Hermit	The Hermit
X	Wheel of Fortune	Wheel of Fortune	Wheel of Fortune	Fortune, Increase	The Sphinx	The Wheel of Fortune	The Wheel of Fortune	The Wheel of Fortune
XI	Strength	Fortitude ("Strength")	Justice	Strength, Sovereign	The Muzzled Lion ("The Tamed Lion")	The Strength	Justice	Lust
XII	The Hanged Man	Prudence	The Hanged Man	Prudence, The People	The Sacrifice	The Hanged Man	The Hanged Man	The Hanged Man
XIII	(unnamed)	Death	Death	Mortality, Nothingness	The Skeleton Reaper ("The Reaper", "The Scythe")	Death	Death	Death
XIV	Temperance	Temperance	Temperance	Temperance, Priest	The Two Urns ("The Genius of the Sun")	Temperance	Temperance	Art
XV	The Devil	Typhon	The Devil	Great Force	Typhon	The Devil	The Devil	The Devil
XVI	The House of God	The Castle of Plutus ("God-House")	The Tower	Misery, Prison	The Beheaded Tower ("The Lightning-Struck Tower")	The Tower	The Blasted Tower	The Tower
XVII	The Star	Osiris, The Dog Star ("Sirius")	The Star	Desolation, Air	The Star of the Magi	The Star	The Star	The Star
XVIII	The Moon	The Moon	The Moon	Comments, Water	The Twilight	The Moon	The Moon	The Moon
XIX	The Sun	The Sun	The Sun	Enlightenment, Fire	The Blazing Light	The Sun	The Sun	The Sun
XX	Judgement	Creation ("The Last Judgement")	Judgement	Judgement	The Awakening of the Dead (the Genius of the Dead)	Judgement	Judgement	The Aeon
XXI	The World	The World ("Time")	The World	Voyage, Earth	The Crown of the Magi	The World	The Universe	The Universe

== Esotericism ==
By the 19th century, the Tarot was being claimed as a "Bible of Bibles", an esoteric repository of all the significant truths of creation. The trend was started by prominent Freemason and Protestant cleric Antoine Court de Gébelin who suggested that the tarot had an ancient Egyptian origin, and mystic divine and kabbalistic significance. A contemporary of his, Louis-Raphaël-Lucrèce de Fayolle, comte de Mellet, added to Court de Gébelin's claims by suggesting (attacked as being erroneous) that the tarot was associated with Romani people and was in fact the imprinted book of Hermes Trismegistus.

These claims were continued by Etteilla. Etteilla is primarily recognized as the founder and propagator of the divinatory tarot, but he also participated in the propagation of the occult tarot by claiming the tarot had an ancient Egyptian origin and was an account of the creation of the world and a book of eternal medicine. Éliphas Lévi revitalized the occult tarot by associating it with the mystical Kabbalah and making it a "prime ingredient in magical lore". As Decker, Depaulis, and Dummett note, "it is to him (Lévi) that we owe its (the Tarot's) widespread acceptance as a means of discovering hidden truths and as a document of the occult... Lévi's writings formed the channel through which the Western tradition of magic flowed down to modern times."

As the following quote by P. D. Ouspensky (Pyotr Demianovich Ouspensky) (1878–1947) shows, the association of the tarot with Hermetic, kabbalastic, magical mysteries continued at least to the early 20th century.

The fact that we question the Tarot as to whether it be a method or a doctrine shows the limitation of our 'three dimensional mind', which is unable to rise above the world of form and contra-positions or to free itself from thesis and antithesis! Yes, the Tarot contains and expresses any doctrine to be found in our consciousness, and in this sense it has definiteness. It represents Nature in all the richness of its infinite possibilities, and there is in it as in Nature, not one but all potential meanings. And these meanings are fluent and ever-changing, so the Tarot cannot be specifically this or that, for it ever moves and yet is ever the same.

Claims such as those initiated by early Freemasons today found their way into academic discourse. Semetsky, for example, explained that tarot makes it possible to mediate between humanity and the godhead, or between god/spirit/consciousness and profane human existence. Christina Nicholson used the tarot to illustrate the deep wisdom of feminist theology. Santarcangeli wrote of the wisdom of the fool, and Sallie Nichols spoke about the archetypal power of individuation boiling beneath the powerful surface of the tarot archetypes.

== Fortune telling ==
Now popularly associated in English-speaking countries with divination, fortune telling, or cartomancy, Tarot was not invented as a mystical or magical tool of divination, but as an instrument for playing card games with a permanent trump suit. The people who published esoteric commentary of the tarot (e.g. Antoine Court de Gébelin and the Comte de Mellet) also published commentary on divinatory tarot. There is a line of development of the cartomantic tarot that occurred in parallel with the imposition of hermetic mysteries on the formerly mundane pack of cards that can usefully be distinguished. It was the Comte de Mellet who initiated this development by suggesting, entirely incorrectly, that ancient Egyptians had used the tarot for fortune telling and provided a method purportedly used in ancient Egypt. (Note: It has been suggested recently that the tarot may have been associated with divination perhaps as early at the 15th century in Bologna, but the evidence is not conclusive. See Franco Pratesi. Tarot in Bologna: Documents from the University Library. The Playing-Card, Vol. XVII, No. 4. pp. 136–146.)

Following the Comte de Mellet, Etteilla invented a method of cartomancy, assigning a divinatory meaning to each of the cards (both upright and reversed), publishing La Cartonomancie française (a book detailing the method), and creating the first tarot decks exclusively intended for cartomantic practice. Etteilla's original method was designed to work with a common pack of cards known as the Piquet pack because Piquet was the most popular game played with 32 cards. In 1783, two years after Antoine Court de Gébelin published Le Monde Primitif, he turned to the development of a cartomantic method using the standard (i.e. Marseilles) tarot deck. His work was published in the book Manière de se récréer avec le jeu de cartes nommées tarots and the creation of a society for tarot cartomancy, the Société littéraire des associés libres des interprètes du livre de Thot. The society subsequently published Dictionnaire synonimique du livre de Thot, a book that "systematically tabulated all the possible meanings which each card could bear, when upright and reversed."

Following Etteilla, tarot cartomancy was moved forward by Marie-Anne Adelaid Lenormand (1768–1830) and others. Lenormand was the first well known cartomancer and claimed to be the confidante of Empress Josephine and other local luminaries. She was so popular, and cartomancy with tarot became so well established in France following her work, that a special deck entitled the Grand Jeu de Mlle Lenormand was released in her name two years after her death. This was followed by many other specially designed cartomantic tarot decks, mostly based on Etteilla's Egyptian symbolism, but some providing other (for example biblical or medieval) flavours as well. Tarot as a cartomantic and divinatory tool is well established and new books expounding the mystical utility of the cartomantic tarot are published frequently.

=== Mysticism ===
By the early 19th century Masonic writers and Protestant clerics had established claims that the tarot trumps were authoritative sources of ancient hermetic wisdom, of Christian gnosis and revelatory tools of divine cartomantic inspiration. In 1870 Jean-Baptiste Pitois (better known as Paul Christian) wrote a book entitled Histoire de la magie, du monde surnaturel et de la fatalité à travers les temps et les peuples. In that book, Christian identifies the tarot trumps as representing the "principle scenes" of ancient Egyptian initiatory "tests". Christian provides an extended analysis of ancient Egyptian initiation rites that involves Pyramids, 78 steps, and the initiatory revelation of secrets. Decker, Depaulis, and Dummett write:

At one stage in the initiation procedure, Christian tells us...the postulant climbs down an iron ladder, with seventy-eight rungs, and enters a hall on either side of which are twelve statues, and, between each pair of statues, a painting. These twenty-two paintings, he is told, are Arcana or symbolic hieroglyphs; the Science of Will, the principle of all wisdom and source of all power, is contained in them. Each corresponds to a "letter of the sacred language" and to a number, and each expresses a reality of the divine world, a reality of the intellectual world and a reality of the physical world. The secret meanings of these twenty-two Arcana are then expounded to him.

Christian attempted to give authority to his analysis by falsely attributing an account of ancient Egyptian initiation rites to Iamblichus, but it is clear that Christian was the source of any initiatory relevance to the tarot trumps. Nevertheless, Christian's fabricated history of tarot initiation were quickly reinforced with the formation of an occult journal in 1889 entitled L'Initiation, the publication of an essay by Oswald Wirth (Joseph Paul Oswald Wirth) (1860–1943) in Le Tarot des Bohémiens by Papus (Gérard Anaclet Vincent Encausse) (1865–1916) that stated that the tarot is nothing less than the sacred book of occult initiation, the publication of a book by François-Charles Barlet (Albert Faucheux) (1838–1921) entitled, not surprisingly, L'Initiation, and the publication of Le Tarot des Bohémians by Papus. Subsequent to this activity the initiatory relevance of the tarot was firmly established in the minds of occult practitioners.

The emergence of the tarot as an initiatory tool was coincident with the flowering of initiatory esoteric orders and secret brotherhoods during the middle of the 19th century. For example, Marquis Stanislas de Guaita founded the Cabalistic Order of the Rosy Cross in 1888 along with several key commentators on the initiatory tarot, e.g. Papus, François-Charles Barlet, and Joséphin Péladan (1858–1918). These orders placed great emphasis on secrets, advancing through the grades, and initiatory tests and so it is not surprising that, already having the tarot to hand, they read into the tarot initiatory significance.

Doing so lent an air of divine, mystical, and ancient authority to their practices and allowed them to continue to expound on the magical and mystical significance of the presumably ancient and hermetic tarot. Be that as it may this activity established the tarot's significance as a device and book of initiation not only in the minds of occult practitioners, but also in the minds of new age practitioners, Jungian psychologists, and general academics.

== See also ==
- Playing Cards (Unicode block)
