= Death (tarot card) =

Tarot card of the Major Arcana

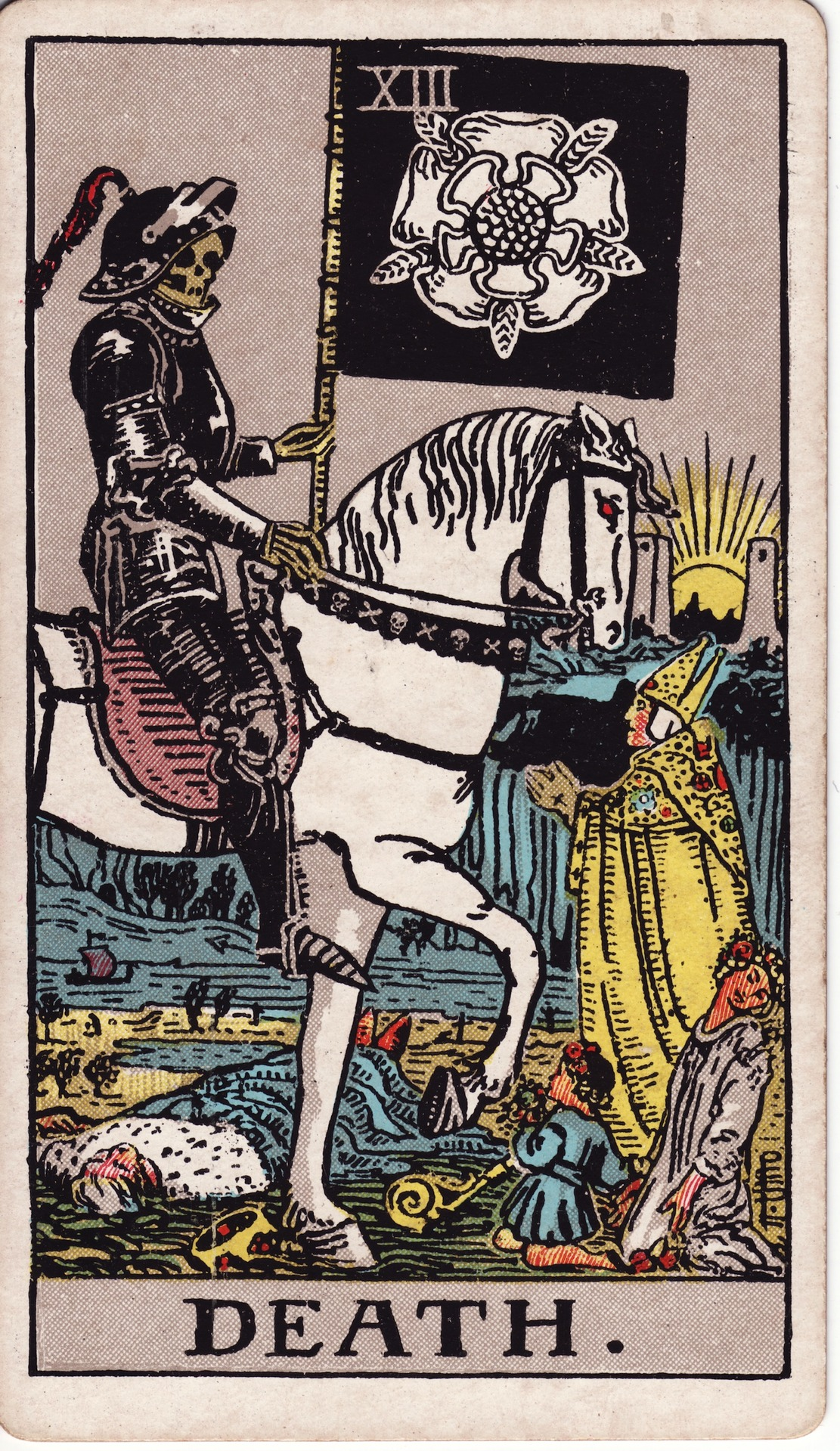
Death, Rider–Waite–Smith tarot deck

Death (XIII) is the 13th trump or Major Arcana card in most traditional tarot decks. It is used in tarot card games as well as in divination. The card typically depicts the Grim Reaper, and when used for divination is often interpreted as signifying major changes in a person's life.

== Description ==
Some decks, such as the Tarot of Marseilles and the Visconti Sforza Tarot omit the name from the card, calling it "The Card with No Name", often with the implication of a broader meaning than literal death. There are other decks that title Death as "Rebirth" or "Death-Rebirth."

The Death card usually depicts the Grim Reaper, the personification of Death. In some decks, the Grim Reaper is riding a pale horse, and often he is wielding a sickle or scythe. Surrounding the Grim Reaper are dead and dying people from all classes, including kings, bishops and commoners. The Rider–Waite tarot deck depicts the skeleton carrying a black standard emblazoned with The White Rose of York.

In the background are two towers and a rising sun.

== Examples ==
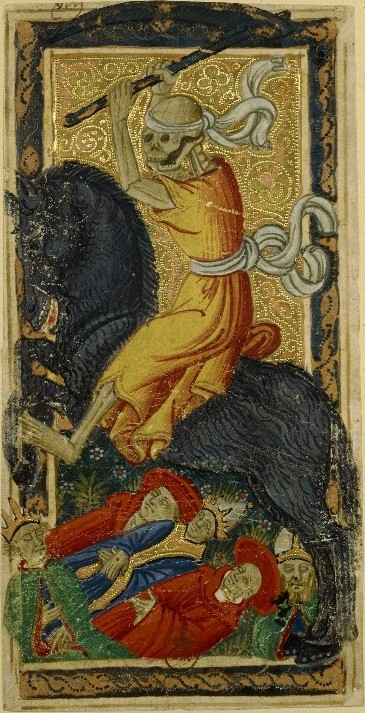
Charles VI (or Gringonneur) (15th century)

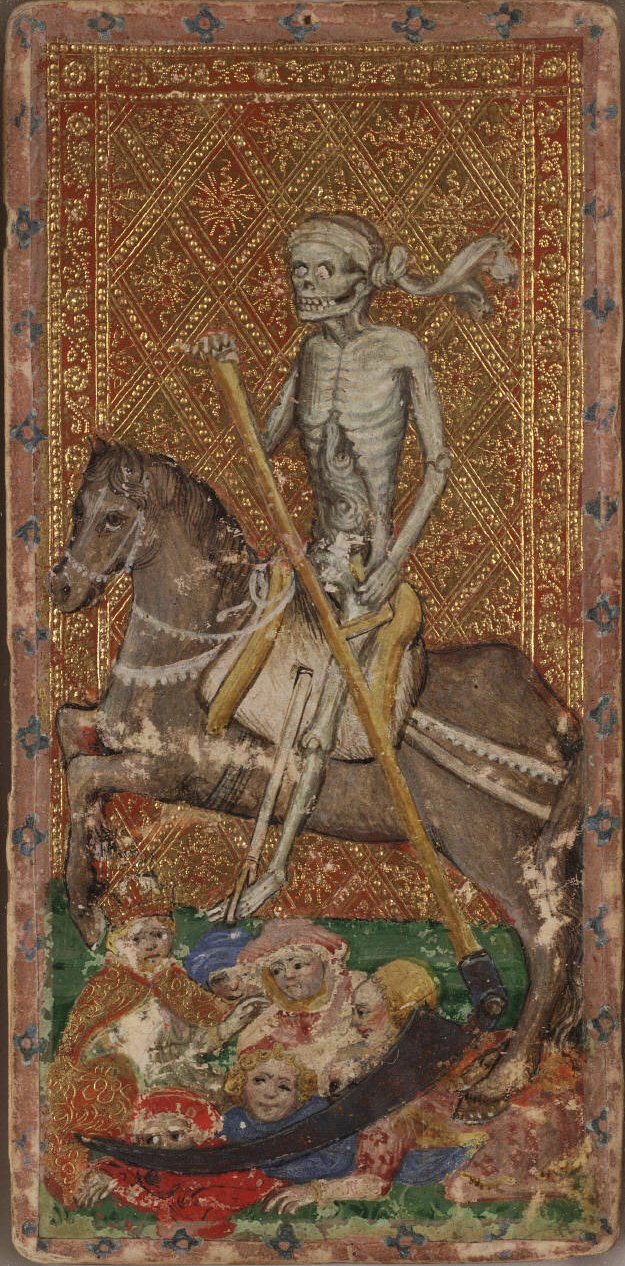
Cary-Yale Visconti (15th century)

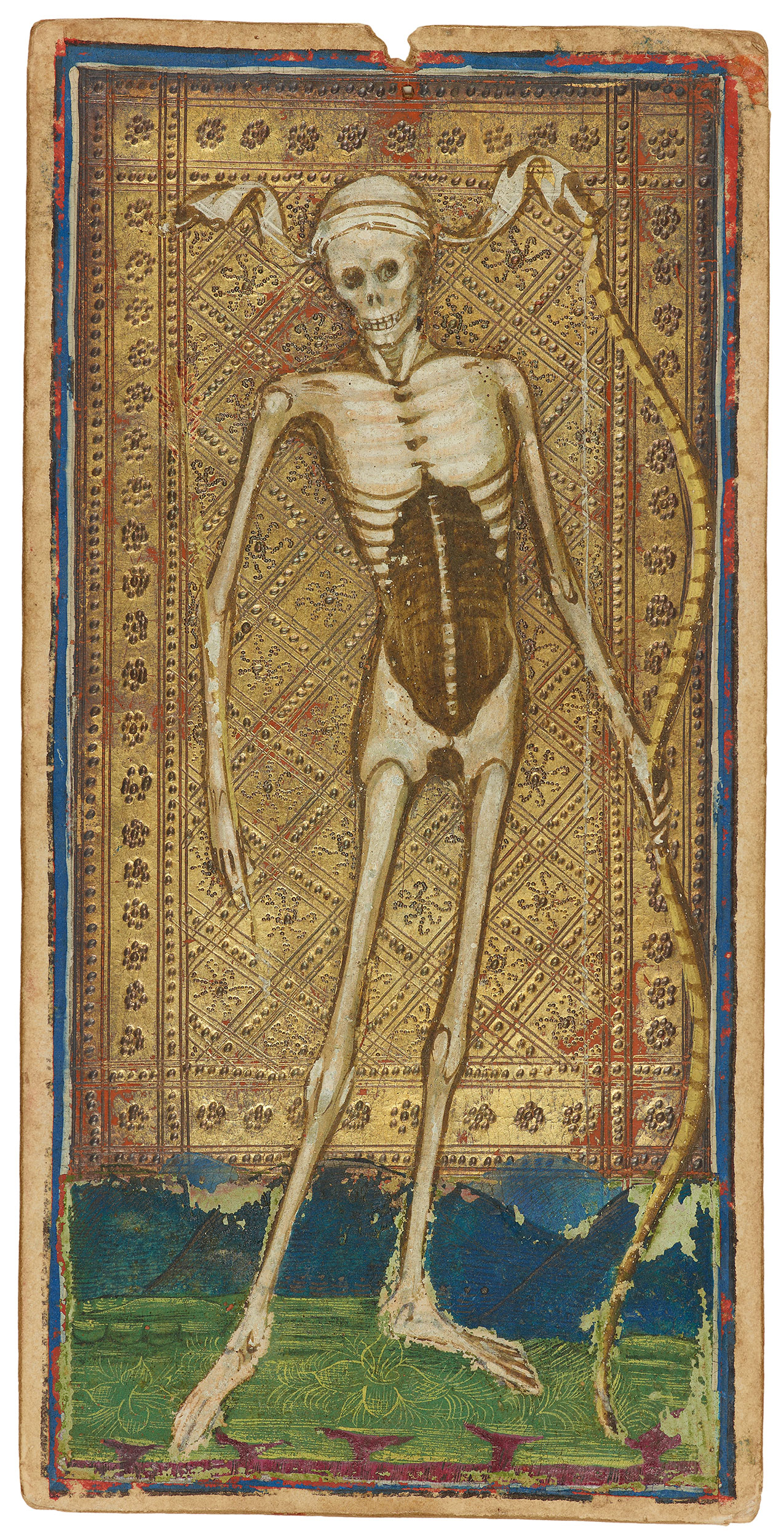
Pierpont Morgan Bergamo (15th century)

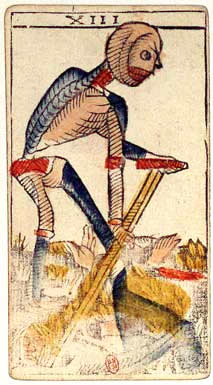
Jean Dodal Marseilles (1701-1715)

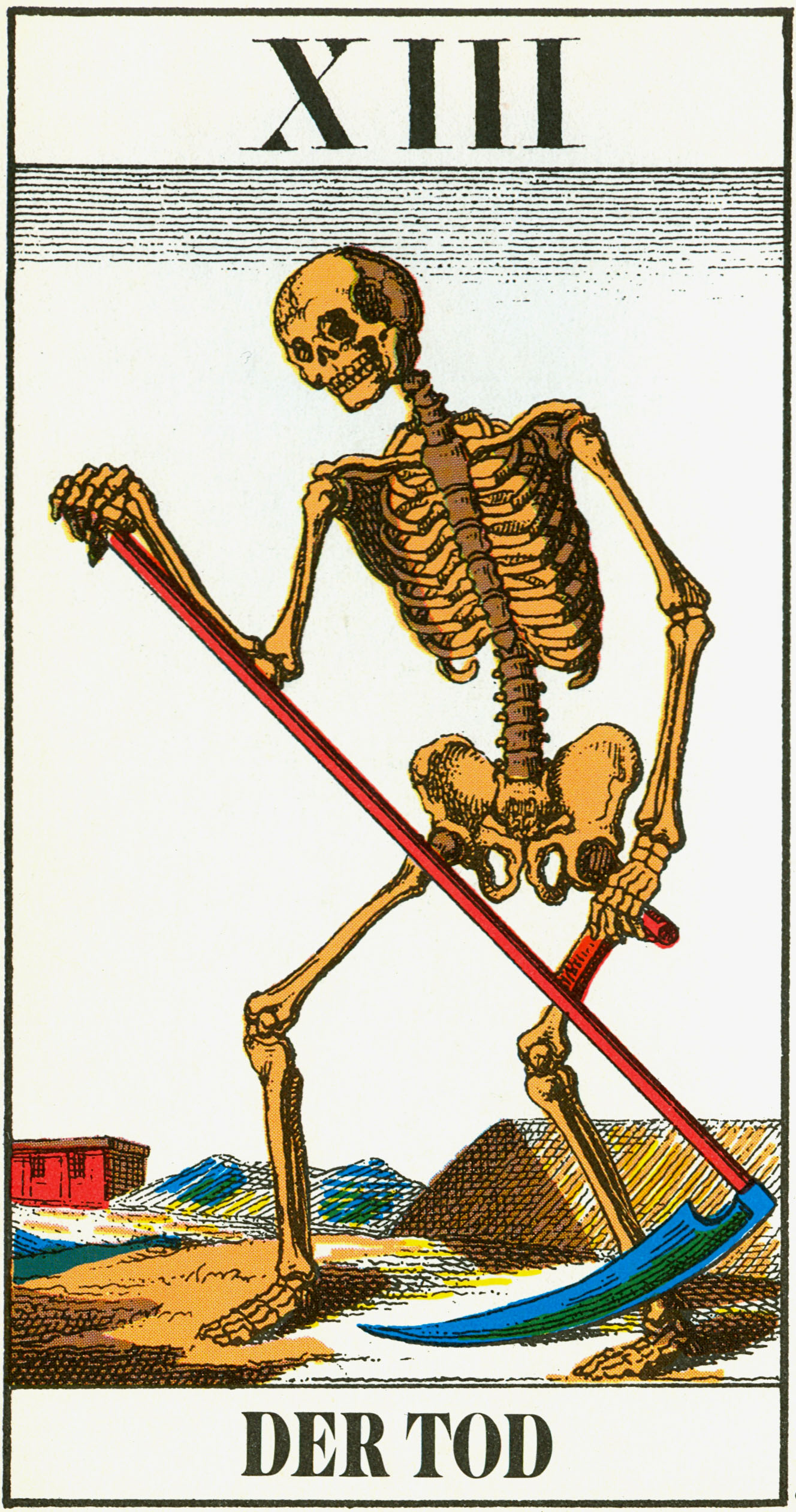
Rauch Troccas (1831–1838)

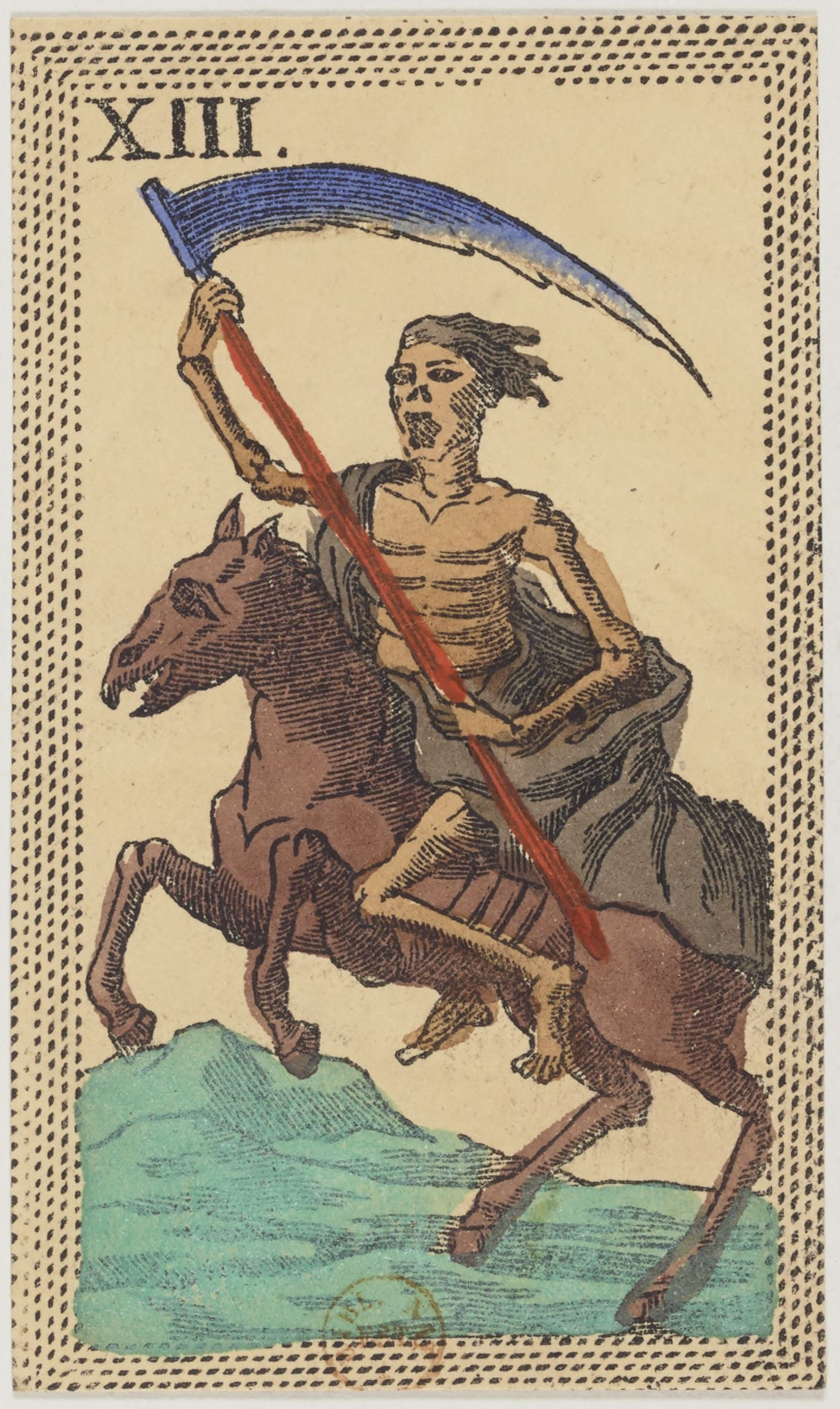
Florence Minchiate (1860–1890)

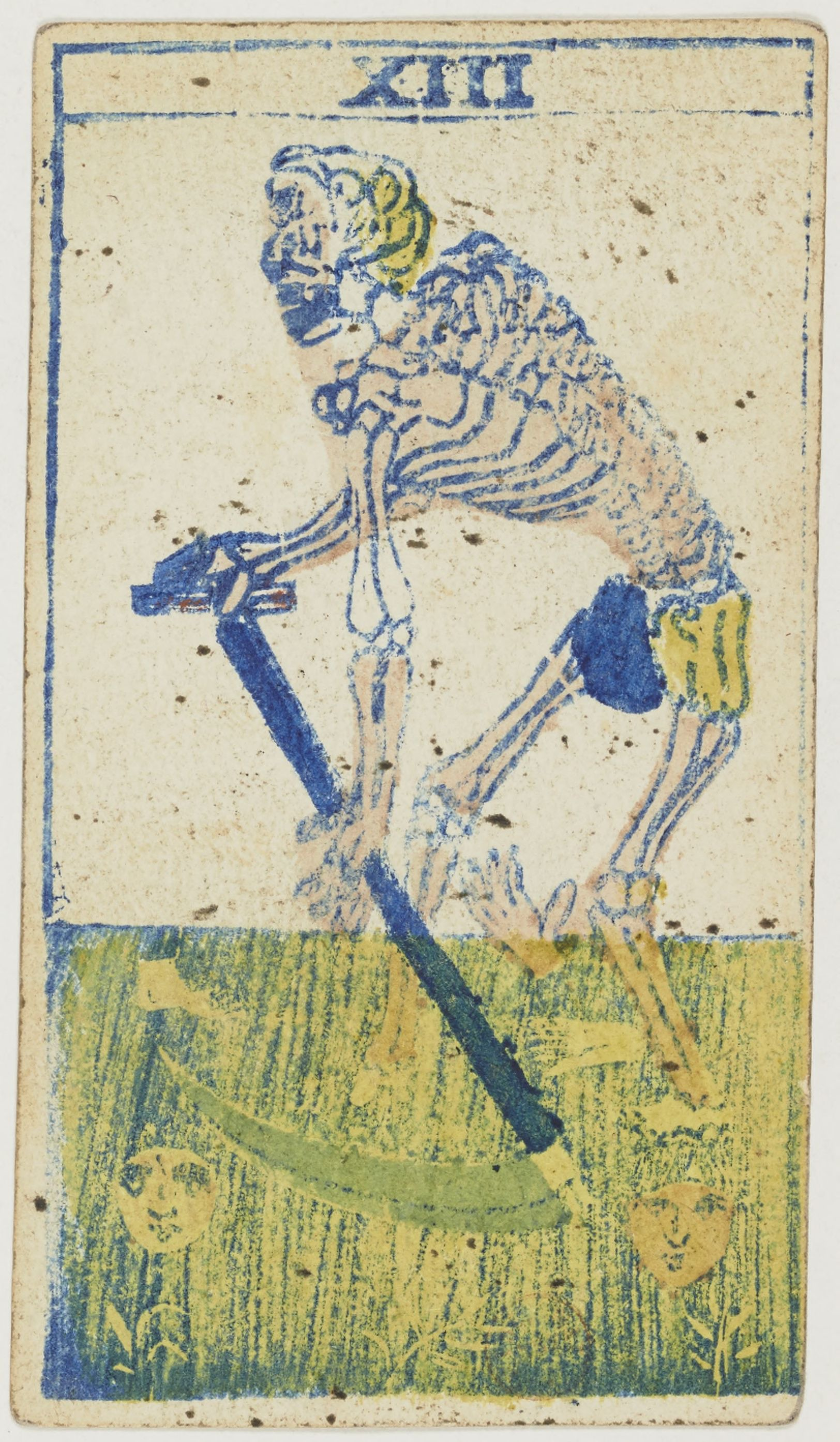
Solesio Piedmontese (1865)

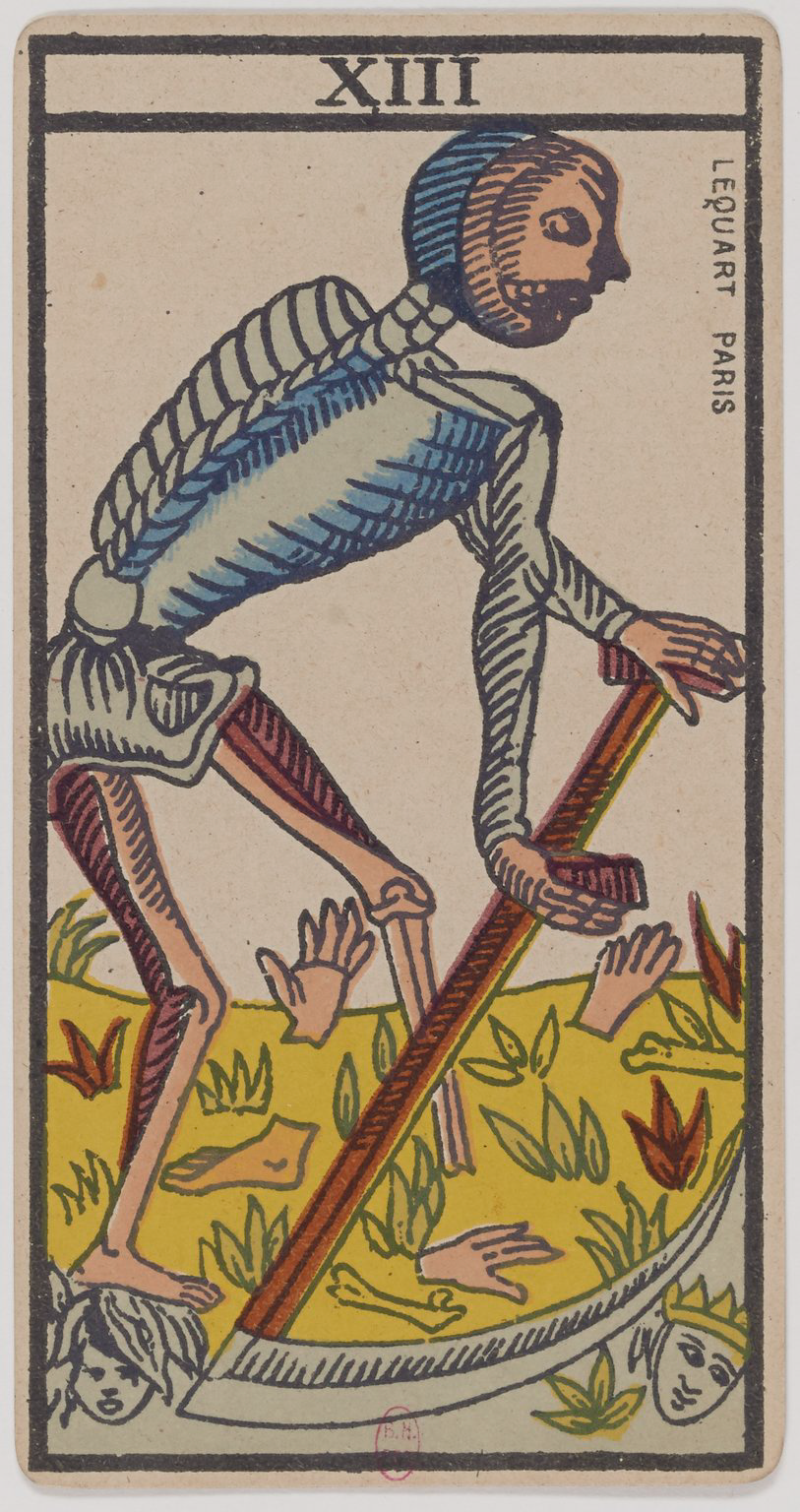
Lequart Marseilles (1890)

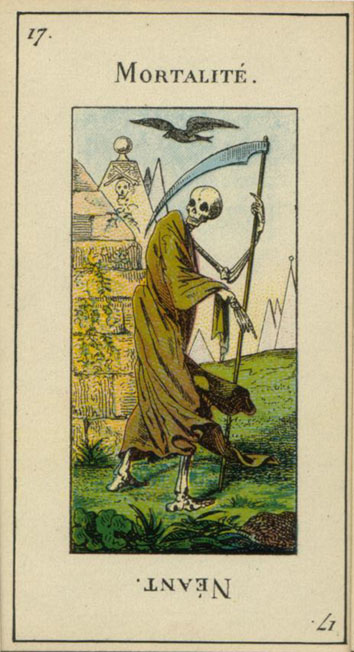
Grimaud Etteilla (1890)

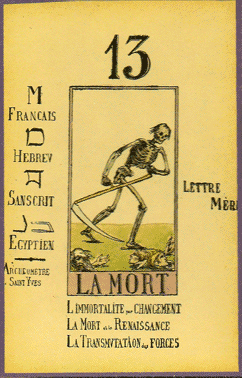
Papus (1909)

== Interpretation ==
According to Eden Gray and other authors on the subject, it is uncommon that this card actually represents a physical death, rather it typically implies an end, possibly of a relationship or interest, and therefore an increased sense of self-awareness.

In fact, Gray interprets this card as a change of thinking from an old way into a new way. The horse Death is riding is stepping over a prone king, which symbolizes that not even royalty can stop change.

The card, drawn in reverse, can be interpreted as stagnation and the inability to move or change, according to Gray.

According to A. E. Waite's 1910 book The Pictorial Key to the Tarot, the Death card carries several divinatory associations:

13. DEATH.—End, mortality, destruction, corruption; also, for a man, the loss of a benefactor; for a woman, many contrarieties; for a maid, failure of marriage projects. Reversed: Inertia, sleep, lethargy, petrifaction, somnambulism; hope destroyed.

In astrology, the Death card is associated with the fixed-water sign of Scorpio.

== See also ==
- Triskaidekaphobia
