= The Moon (tarot card) =

Tarot card of the Major Arcana

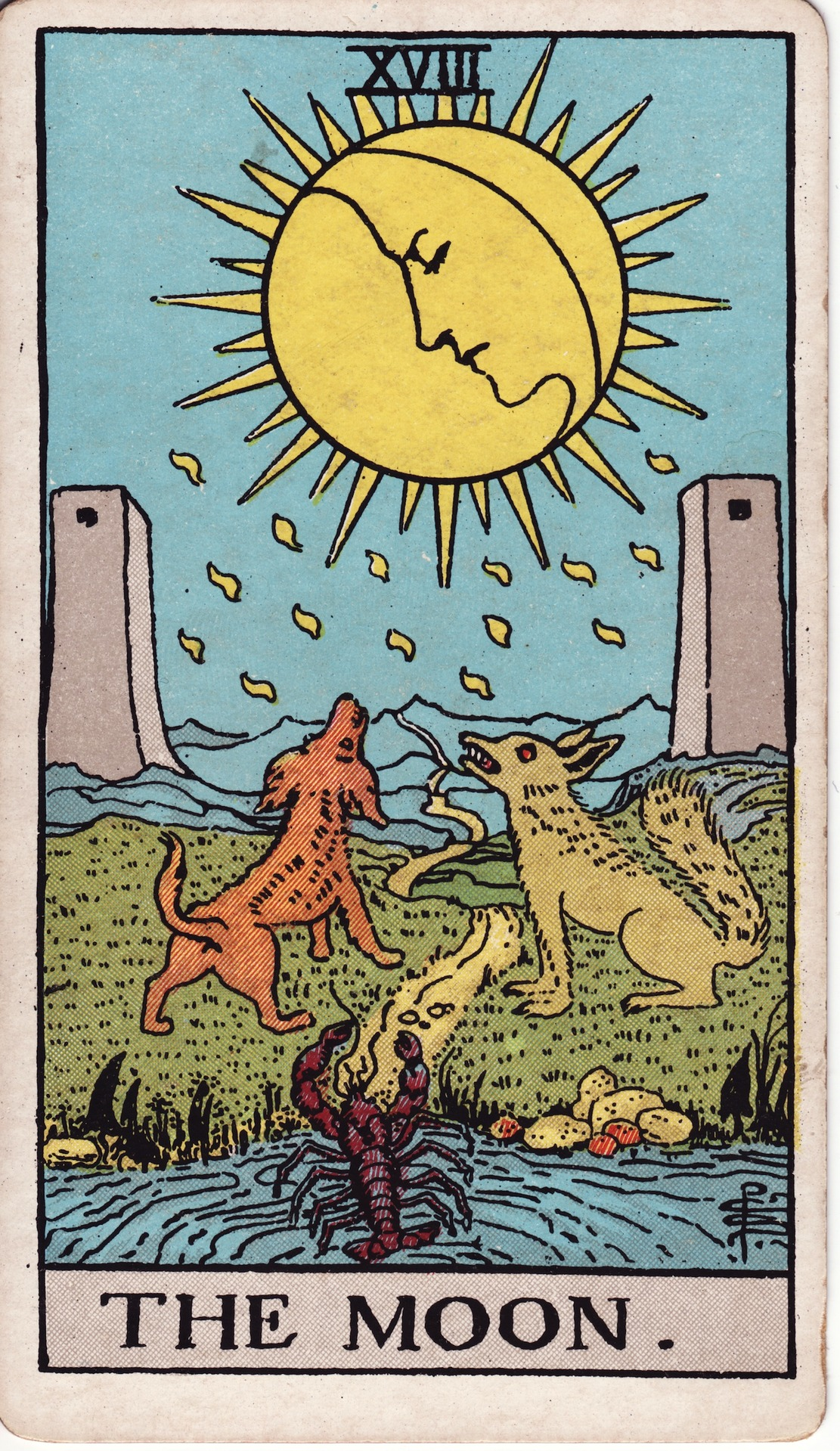
The Moon (XVIII) from the Rider–Waite tarot deck

The Moon (XVIII) is the eighteenth trump or Major Arcana card in most traditional tarot decks. It is used in game playing as well as in divination.

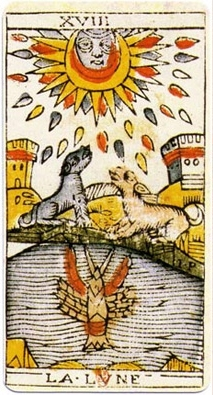
An original card from the tarot deck of Jean Dodal of Lyon, a classic "Tarot of Marseilles" deck. The deck dates from 1701 to 1715.

== Description ==
The card depicts a night scene, where two large pillars are shown. A wolf and a domesticated dog howl at the Moon while a crayfish emerges from the water. The Moon has "sixteen chief and sixteen secondary rays", and "[is] shedding the moisture of fertilizing dew in great drops" (totaling 15 in the Rider–Waite deck) which are all Yodh-shaped.

== Interpretation ==
According to A. E. Waite's 1911 book The Pictorial Key to the Tarot, "the card represents life of the imagination apart from life of the spirit... The dog and wolf are the fears of the natural mind in the presence of that place of exit, when there is only reflected light to guide it... The intellectual light is a reflection and beyond it is the unknown mystery which it cannot reveal." Additionally, "it illuminates our animal nature" and, according to Waite, "the message is 'Peace, be still; and it may be that there shall come a calm upon the animal nature, while the abyss beneath shall cease from giving up a form'."

Waite writes that the Moon card carries several divinatory associations:

18.THE MOON--Hidden enemies, danger, calumny, darkness, terror, deception, occult forces, error. Reversed: Instability, inconstancy, silence, lesser degrees of deception and error.

In astrology, the Moon card is associated with the mutable-water sign of Pisces.
