= Etteilla =

French occultist and astrologer (1738–1791)

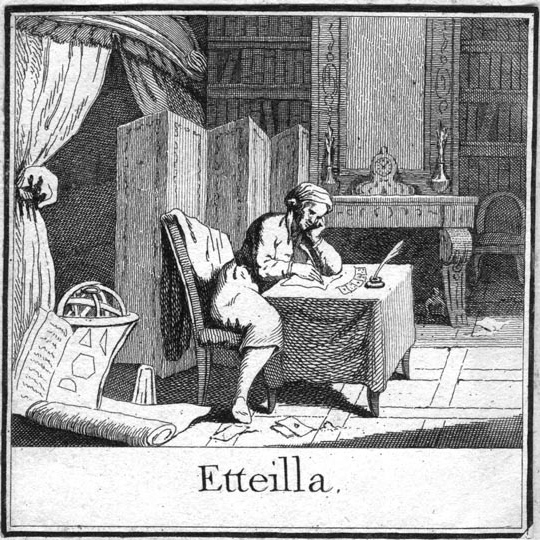
Jean-Baptiste Alliette (Etteilla) at his work table, from the Cours théorique et pratique du livre de Thot (1790).

Etteilla, the pseudonym of Jean-Baptiste Alliette (1 March 1738 – 12 December 1791), was the French occultist and tarot-researcher, who was the first to develop an interpretation concept for the tarot cards and made a significant contribution to the esoteric development of the tarot cards to a wide audience (from 1783), and therefore the first professional tarot occultist known to history who made his living by card divination. Etteilla also influenced the French divination professional Marie Anne Lenormand. From 1783 to 1785, Etteilla published his work Manière de se récréer avec le jeu de cartes nommées tarots ("Way to recreate yourself with the deck of cards called tarots"), which is still considered the standard reference work of Tarot cartomancy. Etteilla published his ideas of the correspondences between the tarot, astrology, and the four classical elements and four humors, and in 1789 he published his own tarot deck, which, however, differed significantly from the classic tarots such as the Tarot de Marseille in terms of structure and card designations.

== Personal life ==
Aside from the birth certificate recording his birth in Paris in 1738, very little is known about Jean-Baptiste Alliette's youth. His father was a maître rôtisseur, a caterer, and his mother was a seed merchant. He married Jeanne Vattier in 1763, a marriage that lasted half a decade, during which he worked as a seed merchant, before publishing his first book, Etteilla, ou maniere de se récréer avec un jeu de cartes ("Etteilla, or way to recreate yourself with a deck of cards") in 1770. Etteilla is simply the reverse of his surname. Recent historical research has shed light on previously little-known aspects of Etteilla's personal and family life.

== Works ==
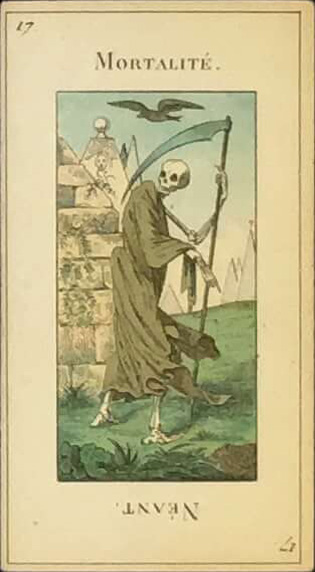
Death card designed by Etteilla, published 1890

Etteilla, ou maniere de se récréer avec un jeu de cartes (1770) was a discourse on the usage of regular playing cards (the piquet deck, a shortened deck of 32 cards used in gaming, with the addition of an "Etteilla" card). Features included the "spread", or disposition on the table, and strictly assigned meanings to each card both in regular and in reversed positions, characteristics that are still central to tarot divination today. In his preface, "Etteilla" explained that he had learned his system from an Italian; it remains unclear to what extent his assigned symbology was his own contribution. The book was reprinted the following year. He was working as a printseller, but from this time, approximately, he earned his livelihood by working as a consultant, teacher and author.

In 1781, the French Swiss Protestant clergyman and occultist Antoine Court who named himself Court de Gébelin published in his massive work Le Monde primitif his idea that the Tarot was actually an ancient Egyptian book of arcane wisdom; his work included an essay by the Comte de Mellet who first called tarot cards the Book of Thoth and, crucially, claimed that the Egyptians used the cards for fortune-telling and described what purported to be their method of divination.There is no evidence to support the notion that tarot has an Egyptian lineage but, influenced by de Gébelin, Etteilla responded with another book, Manière de se récréer avec le jeu de cartes nommées tarots ("Way to recreate yourself with the deck of cards called tarots") in 1783. It was the first book of methods of divination by Tarot. In the book, Etteilla claimed that he had been introduced to the art of cartomancy in 1751, long before the appearance of Court de Gebelin's work. The ideas of Court de Gebelin and Etteilla, although contemporary, remain different in inspiration and content.

In 1788, he formed 'Société des Interprètes du Livre de Thot', a group of French-speaking correspondents through which he continued to discuss his ideas about tarot interpretation. The next year he published a special deck for divination that syncretized his ideas with older forms of French cartomancy. This was the first deck of cards specifically designed for occult purposes.

In 1790, Etteilla founded the Nouvelle Ecole de Magie (New School of Magic). Later that year, he published Cours théorique et pratique du Livre du Thot (Theoretical and practical course from the Book of Thoth), which includes his reworkings of what would later be called the "Major" and "Minor Arcana", as well as the introduction of the four elements and astrology.

== Publications ==
- Etteilla, ou maniere de se récréer avec un jeu de cartes / par M.***, Amsterdam; Paris : Lesclapart, 1770.
- Le Zodiaque mystérieux, ou les oracles d'Etteilla, Amsterdam; Paris : Lesclapart, 1772.
- Etteilla, ou la seule maniere de tirer les cartes; revue, corrigée et augmentée par l'auteur sur son premier manuscrit, Amsterdam; Paris : Lesclapart, 1773.
- Instruction sur le loto des Indiens que nous a donné en 1772 Mr Etteilla, professeur d'algèbre, s.l. [Paris ?], 1782.
- Instruction sur la combinaison hislérique, extraite du Loto des Indiens, s.l. [Paris ?], 1782.
- Etteilla, ou instructions sur l'art de tirer les cartes. Troisiéme et derniere édition par l'auteur de la Cartonomancie, Amsterdam; Paris : Segault; Legras, 1783.
- L'Homme à projets, s.l. [Paris], 1783.
- Manière de se récréer avec le jeu de cartes nommées tarots; pour servir de troisième cahier à cet ouvrage, Amsterdam; Paris : Segault; Legras, 1783.
- Manière de se récréer avec le jeu de cartes nommées tarots; pour servir de premier cahier à cet ouvrage, Amsterdam; Paris : l'auteur; Mérigot; Legras; Segault, 1783.
- Manière de se récréer avec le jeu de cartes nommés Tarots pour servir de quatrième Cahier à cet ouvrage, Reprint 1993 L'astrologie du Livre de Toth (1785) Editions Trédaniel suivi des Recherches sur l'Histoire de l'Astrologie et du Tarot par Jacques Halbronn
- Fragment sur les hautes sciences, suivi d'une note sur les trois sortes de médecines données aux hommes, dont une mal-à-propos délaissée, Amsterdam, 1785.
- Manière de se récréer avec le jeu de cartes nommées tarots; pour servir de quatrième cahier à cet ouvrage, Amsterdam; Paris : l'auteur, 1785.
- Manière de se récréer avec le jeu de cartes nommées tarots; pour servir de second cahier à cet ouvrage, Amsterdam; Paris : l'auteur; les libraires..., 1785.
- Philosophie des hautes sciences : ou la clef donnée aux enfans de l'art, de la science & de la sagesse, Amsterdam; Paris : l'auteur; Nyon l'aîné; Durand neveu; Mérigot le jeune; Segaut, 1785.
- Epître à M. Court de Gébelin, salut, Etteilla, premier de l'an vulgaire 1784, Paris (?), 1784.
- Les sept nuances de l'œuvre philosophique-hermétique, suivies d'un traité sur la perfection des métaux mis sous l'avant-titre L.D.D.P. [= Le Denier Du Pauvre...], s.l. [Paris], s.d. [1786].
- L'Art de connoitre les hommes par l'inspection du front, ou élémens de métoposcopie suivant les anciens. Amsterdam; Paris, 1787.
- L'Art de lire dans les lignes et caractères qui sont dans les mains : ou élémens de chiromance, Amsterdam; Paris, 1787.
- Science. Leçons théoriques et pratiques du livre de Thot. Moyennes classes, Amsterdam; Paris, 1787.
- Jeu des tarots, ou le livre de Thot ouvert à la manière des Égyptiens, pour servir ici à l'interprétation de tous les rêves, songes et visions diurnes et nocturnes, Memphis [Amsterdam ?] : Mad. veuve Lesclapart; Petit; Samson, 1788.
- Cours théorique et pratique du livre de Thot; pour entendre avec justesse l'art, la science et la sagesse de rendre les oracles. s.l. [Paris] : (de l'impr. de la Société Typographique), 1790.
- Aperçu sur la nouvelle école de magie établie à Paris, le premier juillet de la seconde année de la Liberté française, s.l. [Paris] : Etteilla fils, (1790).
- L'Oracle pour et contre mil sept cent quatre-vingt-onze, s.l. [Paris], November 1790.
- Journal projétique et patriotique, 17 numéros parus entre février et juillet 1791.

== See also ==
- A. E. Waite
- Éliphas Lévi
