= Tarot of Marseilles =

Standard pattern of 78 cards

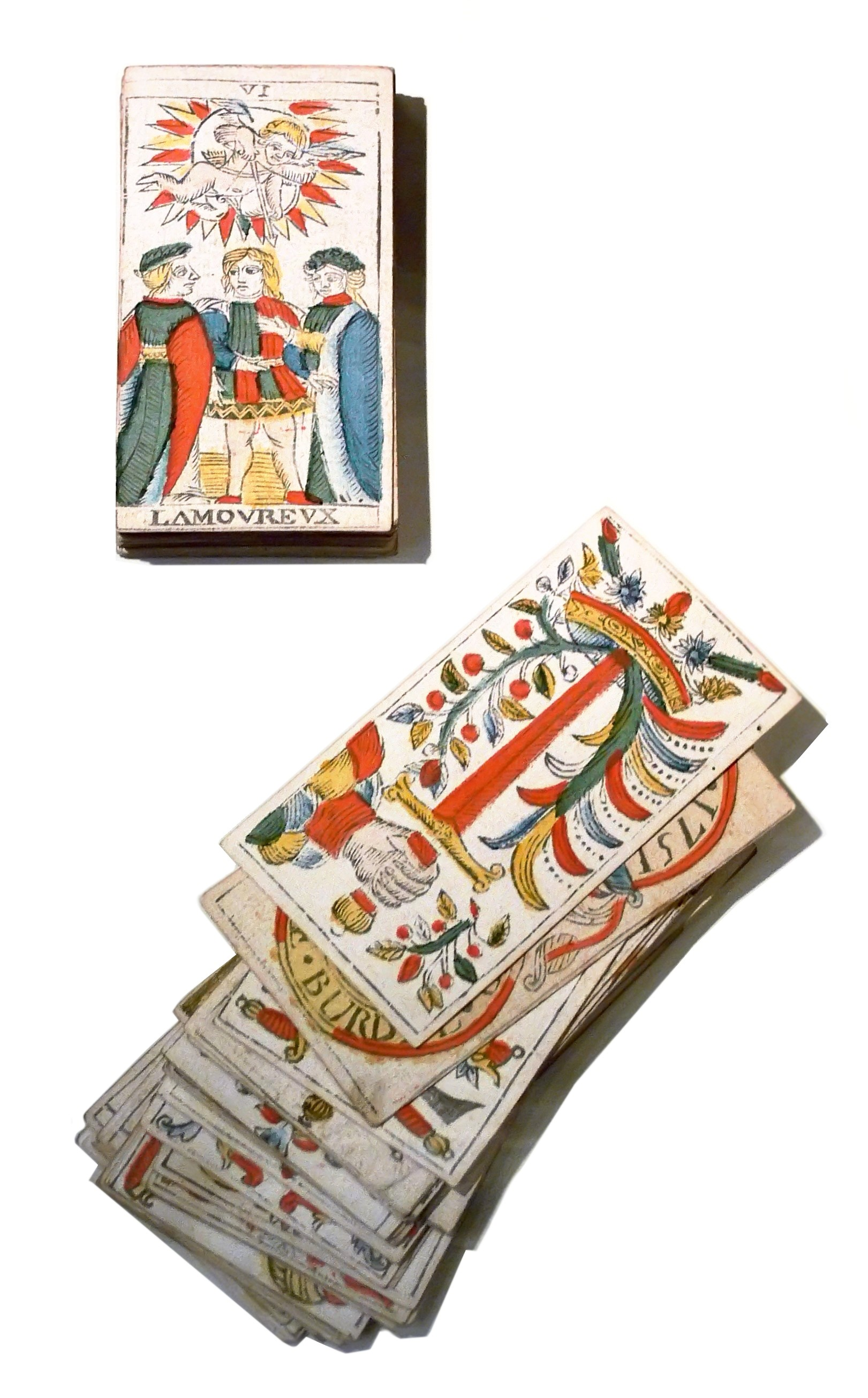
Cards from 1751

The Tarot of Marseilles is a standard pattern of Italian-suited tarot pack with 78 cards that was very popular in France in the 17th and 18th centuries for playing tarot card games and is still produced today. It was probably created in Milan before spreading to much of France, Switzerland and Northern Italy. The name is sometimes spelled Tarot of Marseille, but the name recommended by the International Playing-Card Society is Tarot de Marseille, although it accepts the two English names as alternatives. It was the pack which led to the occult use of tarot cards, although today dedicated decks are produced for this purpose.

== Origins ==
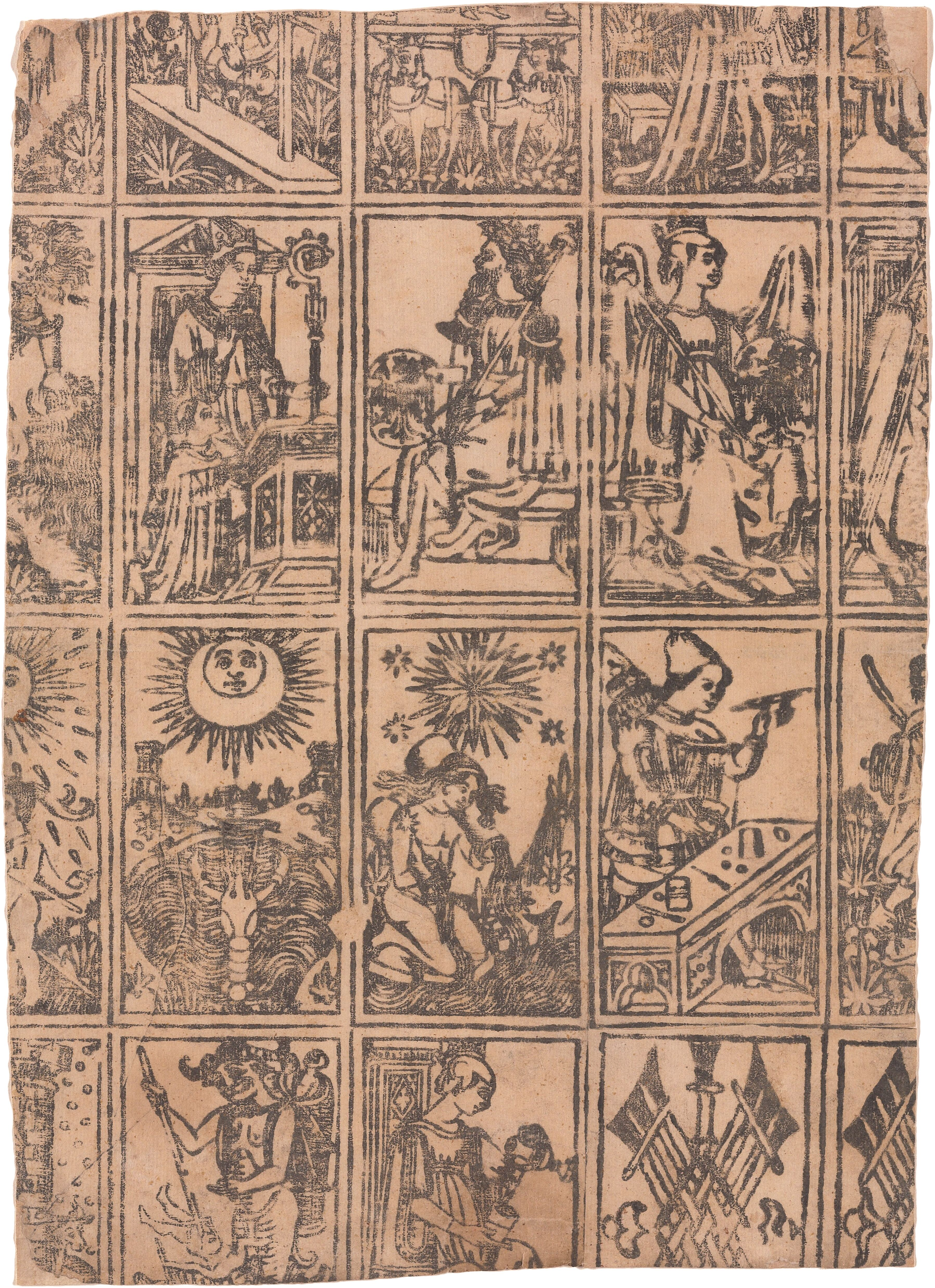
The Cary sheet, an uncut sheet from Milan, c. 1500

Research by Michael Dummett and others demonstrates that the Tarot pack was invented in northern Italy in the early 15th century and introduced into southern France when the French conquered Milan and the Piedmont in 1499. The antecedents of the Tarot de Marseille would then have been introduced into southern France at around that time. All Italian-suited tarot decks outside of Italy are descended from the Milan–Marseilles type with the exception of some early French and Belgian packs which show mixed influence from Tarocco Bolognese (see below). The earliest surviving cards of the Marseilles pattern were produced by Philippe Vachier of Marseilles in 1639 and went up for sale in 2023, having recently been discovered by Thierry Depaulis.

== Etymology and English translation ==
The name Tarot de Marseille is not of particularly ancient vintage; it was coined as late as 1856 by the French card historian Romain Merlin, and was popularized by French cartomancers Eliphas Levi, Gérard Encausse, and Paul Marteau who used this collective name to refer to a variety of closely related designs that were being made in the city of Marseille in the south of France, a city that was a centre of playing card manufacture, and were (in earlier, contemporaneous, and later times) also made in other cities in France. The Tarot de Marseille is one of the standards from which many tarot decks of the 19th century and later are derived.

Others have also tended to use the initials TdM, allowing for ambiguity as to whether the M stands for Marseille or Milan, a region claimed for the origins of the image design.

In deference to the common appellation Marseille for the style and in recognition that the deck appears in other places, the term "Marseille-style" is at times also used.

== Structure ==
Like other tarot decks, the Tarot de Marseille contains fifty-six cards in the four standard suits and twenty-two tarot cards.

=== Suits ===
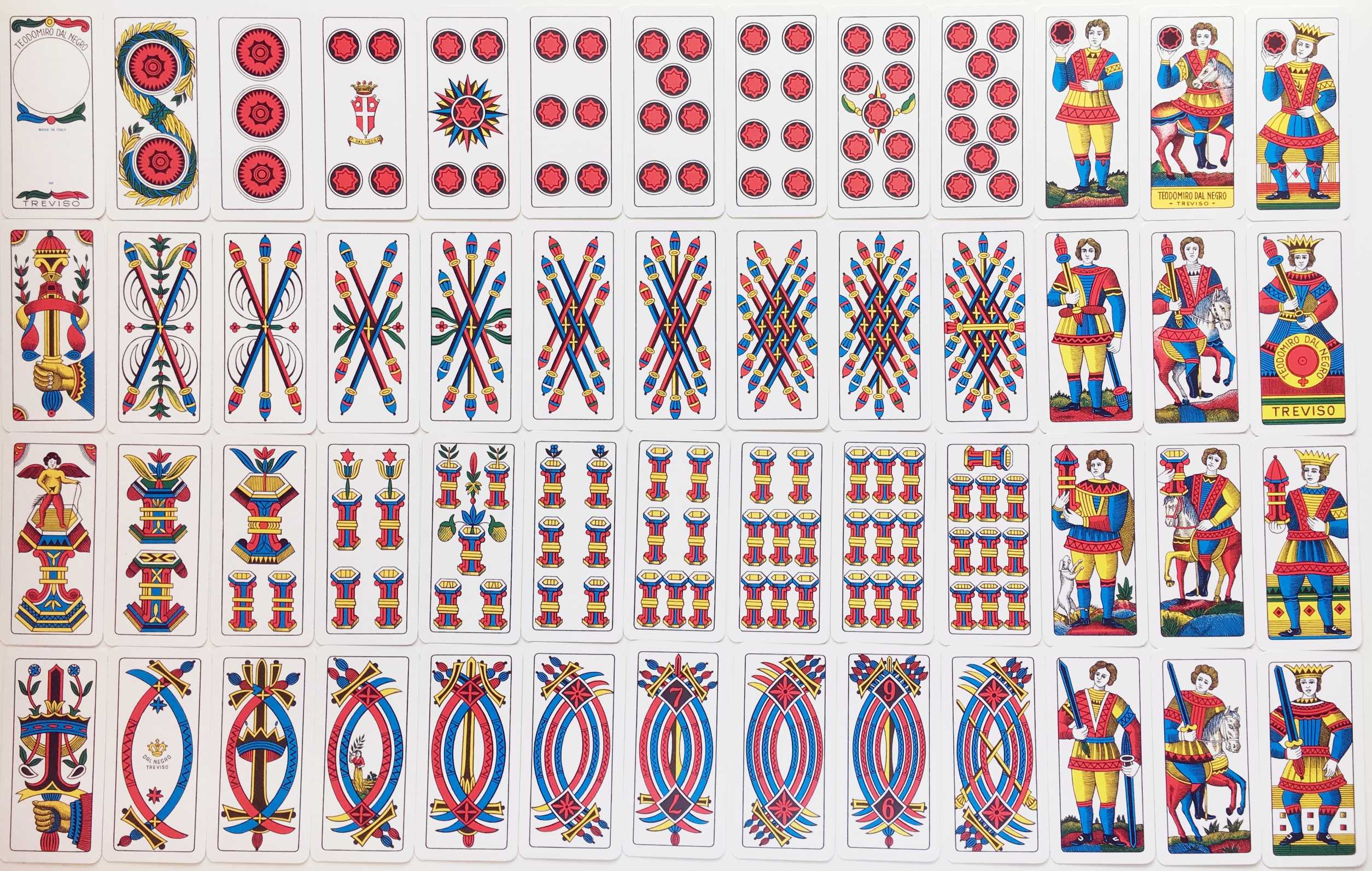
Traditional North Italian playing cards, like the Tarot of Marseilles, distinguish batons (second row) from swords (last row) by the use of straight versus curved lines.

In the French language, the four suits are identified by their French names of Bâtons (Batons), Épées (Swords), Coupes (Cups), and Deniers (Coins). These count from Ace to 10. There was also an archaic practice of ranking the cards 10 to Ace for the suit of cups and coins in line with all other tarot games outside of France and Sicily.

Suits of the Tarot de Marseilles
Suit				
(United Kingdom)	Swords	Cups	Coins	Batons
(France)	Épées	Coupes	Deniers	Bâtons
(Switzerland)	Espée	Coupe	Denier	Baston
(Italy)	Spade	Coppe	Denari	Bastoni
(Spain)	Espadas	Copas	Oros	Bastos

As well, there are four face cards in each suit: a Valet (Knave or Page), Chevalier or Cavalier (Horse-rider or Knight), Dame (Queen) and Roi (King). The court cards are sometimes called les honneurs (the honours) or les lames mineures de figures (the minor picture cards) in French. For the valet de bâtons (French > "Page of Batons"), the title of that card generally appears on the side of the card, while in some old versions of the Tarot de Marseille that card, along with either some or all others, is left unnamed.

In the Tarot de Marseille, as is standard among Italian suited playing cards, the pip cards in the suit of swords are drawn as abstract symbols in curved lines, forming a shape reminiscent of a mandorla. On the even numbered cards, the abstract curved lines are all that is present. On the odd numbered cards, a single fully rendered sword is rendered inside the abstract designs. The suit of batons is drawn as straight objects that cross to form a lattice in the higher numbers; on odd numbered baton cards, a single vertical baton runs through the middle of the lattice. On the tens of both swords and batons, two fully rendered objects appear imposed on the abstract designs. The straight lined batons and the curved swords continue the tradition of Mamluk playing cards, in which the swords represented scimitars and the batons polo mallets.

Tarot of Marseilles by Jean Dodal (1701)
	1	2	3	4	5	6	7	8	9	10	Jack	Knight	Queen	King
Swords														
Cups														
Coins														
Clubs														

In this abstraction, the Tarot, and the Italian playing cards tradition, diverges from that of Spanish playing cards, in which swords and batons are drawn as distinct objects. Cups and coins are drawn as distinct objects. Most decks fill up blank areas of the cards with floral decorations. The two of cups typically contains a floral caduceus-like symbol terminating in two heraldic dolphin heads. The two of coins usually joins the two coins by a ribbon motif; the ribbon is a conventional place for the manufacturer to include their name and the date.

=== Trumps ===
There is also a suit of twenty-two atouts (trump cards). The Fool, which is unnumbered in the Tarot de Marseille, is viewed as separate and additional to the other twenty-one numbered trumps because it usually cannot win a trick.

The labelling of cards is a practice of French origin, Italians remembered their names by heart. The Sola Busca deck is an exception: all trumps are named and have roman numerals, the suited cards are numbered in Hindo-Arabic, and the face suits beyond the page are named as well, with Alexander the Great being the king of swords. The XIII card is generally left unlabelled in the various old and modern versions of the Tarot de Marseille, but it is worth noting that in Noblet's deck (circa 1650), the card was named LAMORT (Death). In at least some printings of the French/English bilingual version of Grimaud's pack, the XIII card is named "La Mort" in French and named "Death" in English. In many modern cartomantic tarot decks (e.g., Rider–Waite), the XIII card is named Death.

The names given to the Marseilles pattern trumps differ from those in early Italian sources. The French la Force (Strength) is in Italian la Fortezza (Fortitude) for the cardinal virtue of Courage. L'Amoureux (the Lover) is in Italy l'Amore (Love). Le Jugement (the Judgement) is l'Angelo (the Angel) or le Trombe (the Trumpets). L'Ermite (the Hermit) is given either as il Gobbo (the Hunchback), il Vecchio (the Old Man), or as il Tempo (Time). Le Pendu (the Hanged Man) is il Traditore (the Traitor). La Torre/la Maison Dieu (the Tower/the House of God) is given either as la Sagitta (the arrow), la Saetta (Lightning), la Casa del Diavolo (the House of the Devil), la Casa del Dannato (the House of the Damned), il Fouco (the Fire), or as l'inferno (Hell). The ranking of the trumps vary according to region or time period.

The following trump images are from Jean Dodal's deck printed in Lyon in the early 18th century. Like most other tarot decks, it uses additive Roman numerals, hence "IIII" instead of "IV". The English names are based on IPCS terminology. Dummett calls Tarot I "The Mountebank", a word which, like the name on the card, bataleur, means 'street entertainer'.

Lequart Paris 1890	Dodal, Lyon, 1715	Number. Label.	Lequart Paris 1890	Dodal, Lyon, 1715	Number. Label.
		(unnumbered) Le Fol (Le Mat) The Fool			I. Le Bateleur The Juggler
Reminiscent of a pair (Note: The tarot deck is precisely one and a half times the size of the standard 52-card deck, its additional twenty-six cards, namely four queens and twenty-two trumps, forming the exact equivalent of two extra card suits, (Note: Decks with five and six suits, respectively, were already attested as early as John of Rheinfelden's late 14th century treatise.) hence the aforementioned doubling, within this initial (sub)section.) (Note: The trumps of the contemporary Boiardo–Viti tarot consist of ten consecutive pairs of men and women, each embodying a vice and a virtue, respectively.) of jacks. (Note: The page of batons, for the former, and those of coins or spades, for the latter.)
(Junon)		II. (Note: The human fate (X) or lifespan, encompassing birth (II), marriage (VI), old age (IX) and death (XIII), wedlock (VI) and monasticism (IX) being often contrasted.) La Pances (La Papesse) The Womb (The Popess)			III. Impératris (L'Impératrice) (The) Empress
Reminiscent of a pair of queens. (Note: In the contemporary Sola Busca tarot, all court cards (save for jacks) are explicitly labelled with additional meanings, taken from classical literature.)
		IIII. L'Empereur The Emperor	(Jupiter)		V. Le Pape The Pope
Reminiscent of a pair of kings.
		VI. (Note: One of the three theological virtues: love (VI), faith (IX) and hope, the latter being usually conflated.) (Note: Imagery reminiscent of astrological signs, as found, for instance, in this 16th century German woodcut: Sagittarius (VI), Libra (VIII), Leo (XI), Aquarius (XIV, XVII), Virgo (XIV, XVII, XXI), Cancer (XVIII), Gemini (XIX). The Minchiate explicitly depict all twelve constellations of the zodiac.) La Moureu (L'Amoureux) The Lover(s)			VII. Le Charior (Le Chariot) The; Chariot(eer)
Reminiscent of an archer, (Note: The contemporary Visconti-Sforza Tarot depicts death with a bow, instead of a scythe, while the earlier Boiardo–Viti deck contains a suit of arrows. An atypical 15th century jack of batons, hosted at the Guildhall Library, is portrayed as an archer aiming at a heron (see also Ambraser Hofjagdspiel).) like those found in the William Tell pack. (Note: First and last row, third from the left.)			Reminiscent of a knight.		
		VIII. (Note: One of the four cardinal virtues, from justice (VIII) to temperance (XIV), the wisdom of old age (IX) complementing the strength of youth (XI).) (La) Justice (The) Justice			VIIII. (Note: Hermits voluntarily renounce ephemeral distractions (0–I), carnal pleasures (VI), and worldly ranks or titles (II–V, VII–VIII).) L('H)ermite The Hermit
Reminiscent of a queen of swords.			Reminiscent of Diogenes. (Note: The Boiardo–Viti and Sola Busca tarots feature exclusively mythical and historical figures of classical antiquity for their trumps and face cards.)		
		X. (Note: Hanging (XII) and being drawn on the breaking wheel (X) constitute medieval forms of torture, execution and capital punishment, oftentimes unto death (XIII).) La Roue de Fortun(e) The Wheel of Fortune			XI. (La) Force (The) Strength
Fate, consisting of rise or ascent, climax or apogee, and downfall or descent.			See lions in heraldry, Nemean lion, (Note: The contemporary da Tortona deck has Hercules wearing its skin.); Samson's riddle, and 1 Samuel 17.		
		XII. Le Pandu (Le Pendu) The; Hanged Man			XIII. (Note: Medieval Christianity saw death (XIII) as the consequence of original sin, itself the result of temptation by the devil (XV), the former being undone by the resurrection unto eternal life, and the latter being condemned at the last judgement, hence the imagery and title of the XX^{th} trump (1 Thessalonians 4:16). In the surviving Visconti-Sforza decks, all intervening trumps between Death and Judgment are either wholly absent from, or form later additions to the original set.) (La Mort) The Death (unlabelled)
Reminiscent of Judas, (Note: The Sola Busca tarot includes two biblical characters in its trump suit. Before 1613, French playing cards featured Judas Maccabeus as the jack of clubs, the gibbet's supporting pillars being reminiscent of batons, and the young man of a knave. In the contemporary Visconti-Sforza Tarot, Strength, occupying the previous position, also resembles a page of wands.) who hung himself, after betraying Jesus. (Note: Labelled The Traitor, in Italian tarots.)			Depicted as the grim reaper and occupying the same position in all tarots.		
		XIIII. Tempérance Temperance			XV. (Note: The cosmological (sub)section, depicting the various vertical layers of the world (XXI), listed in ascending order, from hell (XV) to heaven (XX).) Le Diable The Devil
Reminiscent of a maid of cups, like those found in Visconti-Sforza, (Note: The complete Cary-Yale set.) the Minchiate, and Portuguese-suited playing cards.			The underworld or netherworld, envisioned as a subterranean realm.		
		XVI. La Maison; Dieu The House of God			XVII. Le Toille (L'Étoile) The Star
A tower, (Note: In other tarots (Belgium, Viéville), a tree.) rising towards the sky, and a lightning strike, descending from heaven.			Shares similar imagery with Temperance (XIV), itself reminiscent of a maid of cups.		
		XVIII. La Lune The Moon			XVIIII. Le Soleil The Sun
Night and day. The main luminaries of the celestial sphere.
		XX. Le; Jugement The; Judgement			XXI. Le Monde The World
The angelic heaven, above the firmament.			The world to come after the last judgement (XX).		

== Variants ==
=== Besançon and Swiss patterns ===
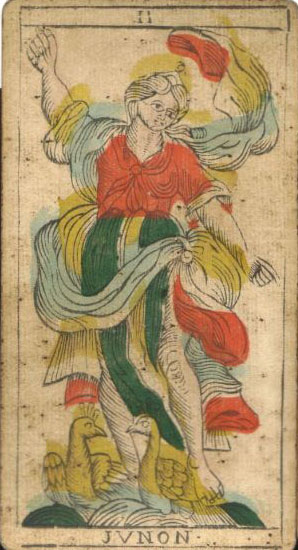
Juno

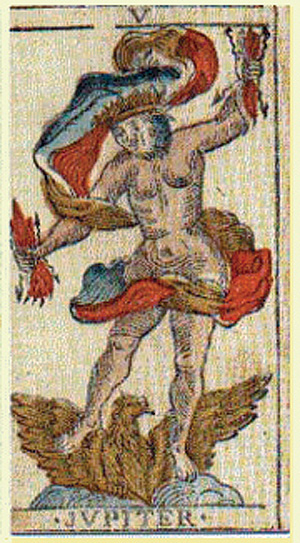
Jupiter

The use of obviously Christian traditional images (such as the Pope, the Devil, the Grim Reaper and the Last Judgement) and indeed controversial images such as La Papesse have spawned controversies from the Renaissance to the present because of its portrayal of a female pope.

One variant of the Tarot de Marseille, now called the Tarot of Besançon, replaces the controversial Popess and Pope and, in their stead, puts Juno with her peacock, and Jupiter with his eagle. Developed in Alsace at the beginning of the 18th century, this deck was popular among Catholics living in regions that bordered Protestant communities. Protestants, and Catholics living outside contentious zones, preferred using the Marseilles pattern. During the French Revolution, the Emperor and Empress cards became the subject of similar controversies and were displaced by Grandfather and Grandmother. It arrived in Besançon only at the beginning of the 19th century where mass-production caused the current association of this deck to that city. An updated variant of the Besançon pattern is the Swiss Tarot which is still in use by Troccas and Troggu players.

=== Piedmontese and Lombard patterns ===
Transformation of the Fool from the Marseilles to modern Piemontese pattern

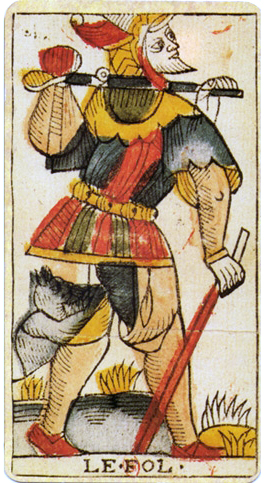
Dodal of Lyon (1701–1715)

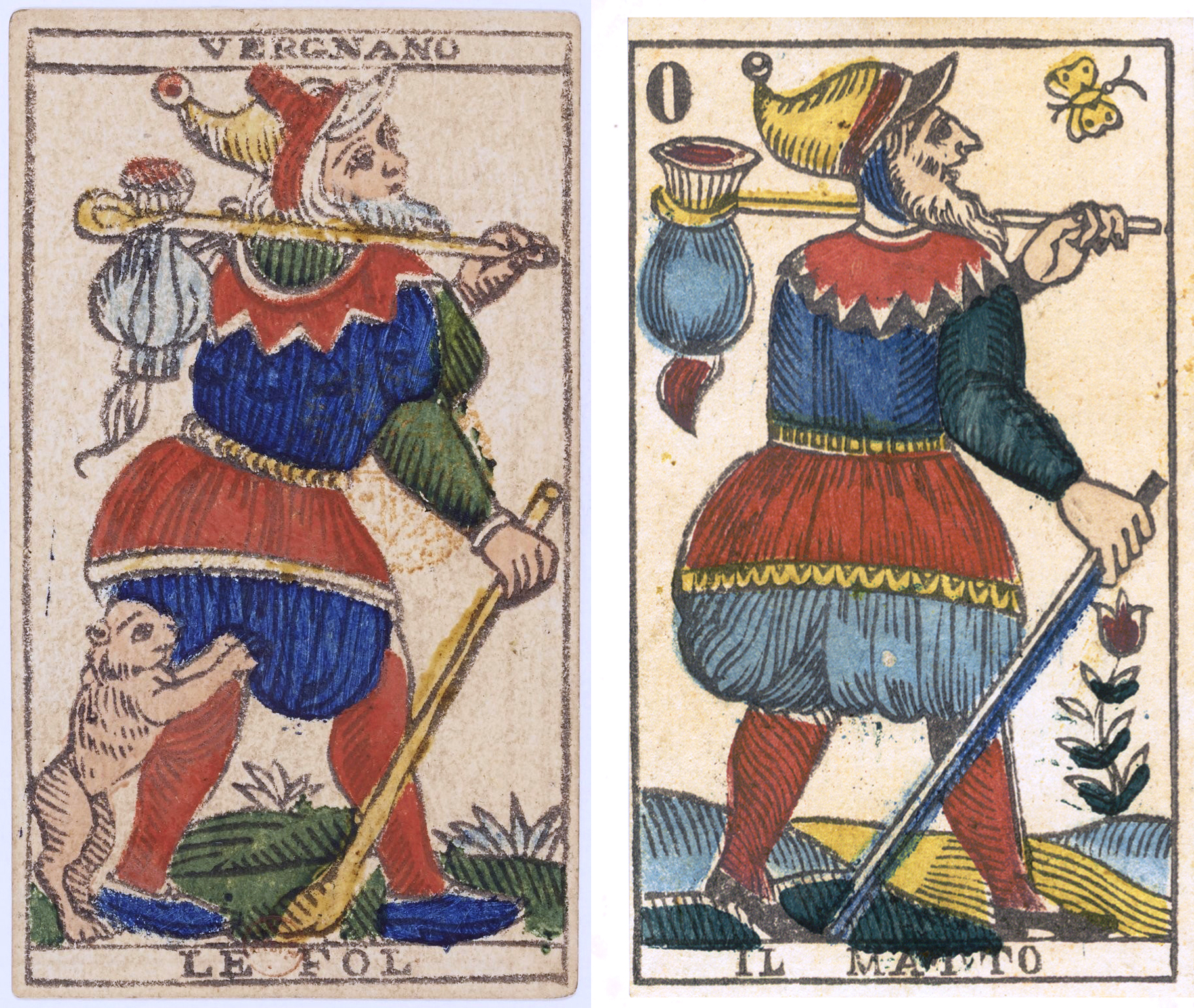
Vergnano of Turin, 1827 and 1830

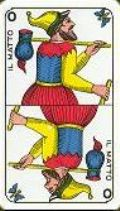
Modern

In the early 18th century, the Marseilles Tarot was introduced in Northern Italy starting from the Kingdom of Sardinia, which also included the Savoy (now in France) and Piedmont, where the card manufacturing industry collapsed following a severe economic depression. The Piedmontese players did not have difficulties to accept the Marseilles Tarot, because the images were similar and even the French language captioning was widespread in many areas of Piedmont.

Around 1820 some manufacturers active in Turin, capital of the Kingdom of Sardinia, began to produce tarot decks in Marseille's pattern, but after few years they introduced captions in Italian and small variations in certain figures. For example, the Fool was not chased by a wild animal but had a butterfly in front of him. In a few decades, variation after variation, was consolidated the iconography of the Piedmontese Tarot, which therefore must be considered as a derivation of the Tarot of Marseilles. It is currently the most widely used tarot deck in Italy.

In the Austrian-ruled Duchy of Milan (modern-day Lombardy), the Marseilles pattern also took root with Italian captioning starting around 1810. The "Death" card was given several names by different manufacturers such as il Tredici (Thirteen), lo Specchio (the Mirror), and Uguaglianza (Equality). Production of this pattern stopped before the First World War.

Around 1835, Carlo Della Rocca of Milan engraved an elaborate interpretation of the Marseilles pattern. It became popular throughout Lombardy for the duration of the 19th century. It spread to Piedmont where a double-ended version was adapted to local tastes and was popular until the 1950s.

=== Early French decks and the Belgian pattern ===
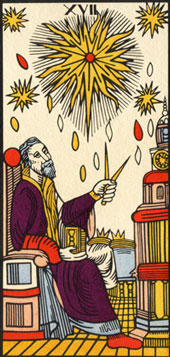
L'Étoile, from the northern French Tarot of Jacques Viéville (c. 1650)

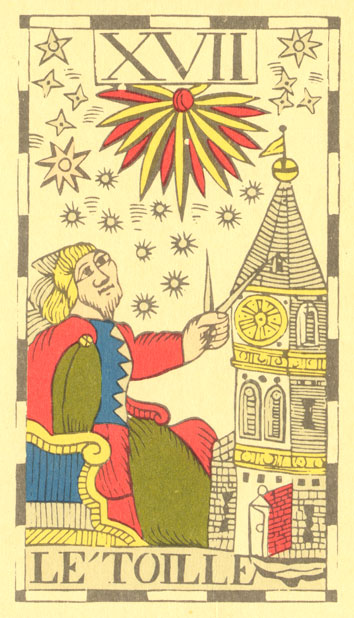
Le'Toille, from the Belgian Tarot, c. 1780

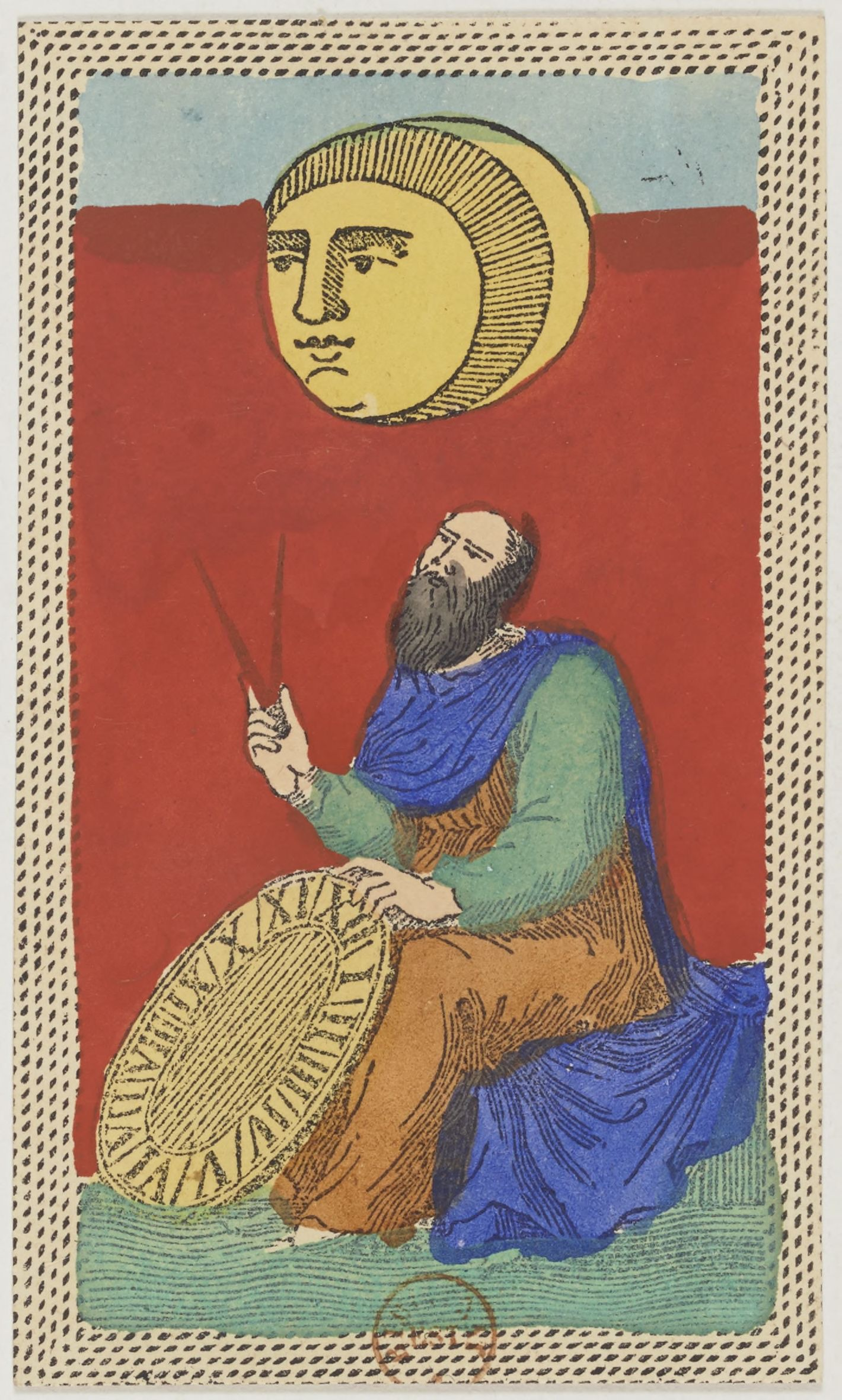
La Luna, from late Minchiate, 19th century

A few early French decks exhibit certain curiosities. The 1557 luxury tarot deck by Catelin Geoffrey of Lyon, the early 17th century Tarot de Paris, and Jacques Viéville's Parisian deck (c. 1650) share many things in common with each other and the Marseilles pattern but also have designs that seem to be derived from the Bologna-Florence tradition as seen in the Tarocco Bolognese and the Minchiate.

Gérard Bodet of Liège produced a deck similar to Viéville's in 1693 where la Papesse is replaced with Le 'Spagnol Capitano Eracasse (Italian > the 'Spanish Captain' Fracasso, a stock character from Commedia dell'arte). The Pope, often depicted holding an orb or a covered communion chalice, is replaced by Bacus (Bacchus, the Roman god of wine) holding a wine cup or bottle and a fruited vine cane or bunch of grapes while astride a beer barrel or wine cask; this was copied from the Deuce of Acorns found in some German-suited patterns. The Hanged Man is shown still pendant but right-side up. Temperance bears the motto FAMA SOL (Latin > "The Rumored or Omened Day") in a scroll, probably counseling patience until the day of their deliverance from Spain. The Tower is renamed La Foudre (French > "The Lightning"), and shows a man sitting beneath a tree being struck by lightning. The Star shows a man with compasses staring up at the sky next to a tower. The Moon shows a woman holding a distaff and The Sun shows a man on horseback bearing a banner. The World depicts a naked woman atop a globe parted into a moon in a starry sky and a sun in a blue sky over a tower on land. When Adam C. de Houtot of Rouen produced a similar deck in 1723, the Fool is numbered as trump XXII likely showing that it functioned as the highest trump. Very similar decks were soon produced in the Austrian Netherlands (modern-day Belgium) until the beginning of the 19th century. Packaging indicates that they were locally called "Cartes de Suisses". This may suggest that Belgian players were being influenced by a new mode of play emanating from Switzerland in which the Fool is treated like the highest trump as in Troggu.

Dummett conjectures that this family of decks, especially those of Viéville's design, originate from the Savoy-Piedmont-Lombardy region and were used until the collapse of the local card manufacturing industry at the end of the 17th century (as described above). Viéville's ordering of the trumps is almost identical to 16th century orders in Pavia and Mondovì. However, no cards from this region before the 18th century are known to have survived to prove or disprove this theory.

== Later history ==
All cards were originally printed from woodcuts; the cards were later coloured either by hand or by the use of stencils. Tarot was recorded as being very popular card game throughout France during the 16th and early 17th century but later fell into obscurity with the exception of eastern France and Switzerland. Very few Marseilles pattern cards from the 17th century have survived, chiefly among them are Noblet's. In contrast, dozens of decks from the 18th century have made it to the present. From eastern France and Switzerland, the game spread north to Sweden and east to Russia starting from the middle of the 18th century, making it one of the most popular card games of that era until being overtaken by Whist in the 19th century.

One well-known artisan producing tarot cards in the Marseilles pattern was Nicolas Conver (circa 1760). It was the Conver deck, or a deck very similar to it, that came to the attention of Antoine Court de Gébelin in the late 18th century. Court de Gébelin's writings, which contained much by way of speculation as to the supposed Egyptian origin of the cards and their symbols, called the attention of occultists to tarot decks. As such, Conver's deck became the model for most subsequent esoteric decks, starting with the deck designed by Etteilla forward. Cartomancy with the Tarot was definitely being practised throughout France by the end of the 18th century; Alexis-Vincent-Charles Berbiguier reported an encounter with two "sibyls" who divined with Tarot cards in the last decade of the century at Avignon.

From the mid-18th to early 19th centuries, Marseilles and Besançon tarots were replaced by the French-suited animal tarots throughout most of Europe. These were then superseded by genre art tarots like the Industrie und Glück. French players ignored animal tarots but during the 20th century, they switched over to the genre art Tarot Nouveau. French truck drivers were still using the Marseilles pattern for French tarot as late as the 1970s.

In 1985, the book Meditations on the Tarot was first published in English. It is a series of twenty-two so-called "Letter-Meditations" of the Major Arcana of the Tarot and uses the Marseille Tarot as the basis from which it begins its "Meditations" in the form of 22 letters which are addressed to the "Dear Unknown Friend". It has been highly praised by many people from many walks of life as an amazing contribution to – and a work of singular significance in – the Christian Hermetic tradition.

In 1997 Alejandro Jodorowsky and Phillipe Camoin completed their reconstructed version of the Tarot of Marseille. Since then Jodorowky, in collaboration with Marianne Costa, published a Tarot book based around this reconstructed version of the Marseille deck.

== Influence on French and English tarot design and usage ==
In the English-speaking world, where there is little or no tradition of using tarots as playing cards, tarot decks only became known through the efforts of occultists influenced by French tarotists such as Etteilla, and later, Eliphas Lévi. These occultists later produced esoteric decks that reflected their own ideas, and these decks were widely circulated in the anglophone world. Various esoteric decks such as the Rider–Waite Tarot deck (conceived by A. E. Waite and rendered by Pamela Colman Smith), and the Thoth Tarot deck (conceived by Aleister Crowley and rendered by Lady Frieda Harris)—and tarot decks inspired by those two decks—are most typically used. Waite, Colman Smith, Crowley and Harris were all former members of the influential, Victorian-era Hermetic Order of the Golden Dawn at different respective points in time; and the Golden Dawn, in turn, was influenced by Lévi and other French occult revivalists. Although there were various other respective influences (e.g., Etteilla's pip card meanings in the case of Waite/Colman Smith), Waite/Colman Smith's and Crowley/Harris' decks were greatly inspired by the Golden Dawn's member-use tarot deck and the Golden Dawn's tarot curriculum.

The Hermetic Order of the Golden Dawn was essentially the first in the Anglophone world to venture into esoteric tarot. Francophone occultists such as Court de Gebelin, Etteilla, Eliphas Lévi, Oswald Wirth and Papus were influential in fashioning esoteric tarot in the French-speaking world; the influence of these occultists has come to bear even on interpretation of the Tarot de Marseille cards themselves. Even though the Tarot de Marseille decks are not "occult" per se, the imagery of the Tarot de Marseille decks is claimed by Levi to have Hermetic influences (e.g., alchemy, astronomy, etc.). Referring to the Tarot, Eliphas Levi declares: "This book, which may be older than that of Enoch, has never been translated, but is still preserved unmutilated in primeval characters, on detached leaves, like the tablets of the ancients... It is, in truth, a monumental and extraordinary work, strong and simple as the architecture of the pyramids, and consequently enduring like those – a book which is the summary of all sciences, which can resolve all problems by its infinite combinations, which speaks by evoking thought, is the inspirer and moderator of all possible conceptions, and the masterpiece perhaps of the human mind. It is to be counted unquestionably among the very great gifts bequeathed to us by antiquity..." However, Dummett has shown Levi's claim to be entirely fictitious.

In the French-speaking world, users of the tarot for divination and other esoteric purposes such as Alejandro Jodorowsky, Kris Hadar, and many others, continue to use the Tarot de Marseille. In the mid-1990s Jodorowsky contacted a late descendant of the Camoin family, who has printed the Tarot of Marseilles since the 19th century. They worked together for almost a decade to put together a 78-card deck, including the original detail and 11 color printing.

Paul Marteau pioneered the number-plus-suit-plus-design approach to interpreting the numbered pip cards forming the Minor Arcana of the Tarot de Marseille. Before Marteau's book Le Tarot de Marseille (which was first published "circa" 1930s), cartomantic meanings (such as Etteilla's) were generally the only ones published for interpreting Marseille pip cards. Even nowadays, many French tarotists employ only the Major Arcana cards for divination. In recognition of this, many French-language Tarot de Marseille discuss the symbolism and interpretation of only the Major Arcana.

Many of the images of the Rider–Waite deck are derived from the Tarot de Marseille, although the influence of other decks is also apparent.

Despite its name, very few people in present-day Marseille are familiar with the Tarot de Marseille, and tarot readers are rare to come by.

== Reproductions ==
Due to its continuing popularity, there have been numerous facsimiles, restorations, and recreations of the Tarot of Marseilles:

- The French publisher Grimaud's Marseilles deck, published in 1970, was designed by Paul Marteau.
- The Italian firm Lo Scarabeo prints a reproduction of an 18th-century deck by Nicholas Conver, with a reconstructed card missing from their original, as well as a version based on a 1751 Swiss deck by Claude Burdel, with an alteration that sees a zero added to Le Fou. In a 1750 Swiss deck by Rochus Schär, Le Mat is also numbered zero.
- The French firm Héron publishes a photo-reproduction of the complete Conver deck held in the Bibliothèque Nationale.
- The Spanish publisher Fournier prints an edition.
- U.S. Games Systems printed the CBD Marseilles Tarot by Yoav Ben-Dov, which was based on the Nicholas Conver deck.
- Cartamundi released a deck based on the 1701 Dodal Tarot de Marseille.
- The Dodal deck held in the Bibliothèque Nationale was photographically published by Dussere.
- Jean-Claude and Roxanne Flornoy have also published renditions of the Noblet and the Dodal decks.
- In 1998 Alejandro Jodorowsky and Philippe Camoin published a restored version of the Tarot of Marseilles based on a study of all the oldest existing decks and wooden moulds.
- in 2003, Daniel Rodes and Encarna Sanchez of Le Mat published El Tarot de Marsella: Los antiguos iconos del Tarot reconstruidos, featuring a reconstructed Marseilles Tarot.
- Igor Barzilai published a restoration of the Nicolas Conver tarot, hand-painted, and using old paper techniques.
- In 2019, Krisztin Kondor and William Rader of Artisan Tarot of Denver, Colorado, published a restored and redrawn edition of the Nicolas Conver tarot. Artwork was added to bring the cards up to the popular tarot aspect ratio of 2 3/4″ × 4 3/4″. Two versions were published in French and English. Additionally, Kondor released a limited edition 11 3/4″ × 16 1/2″ linocut print of Le Bateluer, in eight colors of ink on archival quality paper.
