= Antoine Court de Gébelin =

18th-century French historian

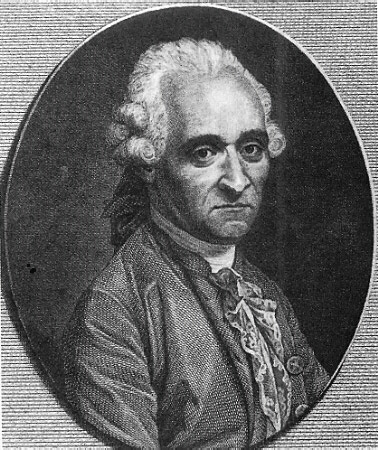
Antoine Court de Gébelin

Antoine Court, who named himself Antoine Court de Gébelin (Nîmes, 25 January 1725 – Paris, 10 May 1784), was a Protestant pastor, born in Nîmes, who initiated the interpretation of the Tarot as an arcane repository of timeless esoteric wisdom with imagined origins in Ancient Egypt in 1781.

The New International Encyclopedia of 1914 reports that Court de Gébelin, who adopted the surname of his grandmother, was a literary man of recognized rank, and rendered excellent service, first as his father's amanuensis and assistant, and afterward as a scholar at the capital. He is remembered in connection with the case of Jean Calas, by his work Les Toulousaines, ou lettres historiques et apologétiques en faveur de la religion réformée (Lausanne, 1763).

== Early life ==
His father was Antoine Court, a famous religious leader of the Huguenots. Court de Gébelin had been ordained a pastor in 1754 before departing from Switzerland and remaining openly Protestant and a rational advocate for freedom of conscience in Enlightenment France. In Paris, he was initiated into Freemasonry at the lodge Les Amis Réunis, in 1771, and moved on to the lodge Les Neuf Sœurs where he welcomed Benjamin Franklin as a lodge-brother.

== Career ==
He was a supporter of American Independence who contributed to the massive Affaires de l'Angleterre et de l'Amérique, of the new theories of economics, and of the "animal magnetism" of Mesmer.

In a letter from the Reverend James Madison to James Madison dated 15 June 1782 he is spoken of with the words, "Mr. Gibelin of Paris, who is said tho’ to have a very great Reputation."

He was elected a Foreign Honorary Member of the American Academy of Arts and Sciences in 1781. In 1783, he was elected a member of the American Philosophical Society in Philadelphia.

His great project had its goal to reconstruct the high primeval civilization. Reinterpreting Classical and Renaissance evocation of the Golden Age in mankind's early history, Court de Gébelin asserted that the primitive worldwide civilization had been advanced and enlightened. He is the intellectual grandfather of much of modern occultism. His centers of focus are the familiar ones of universal origins of languages in deep time and the hermeneutics of symbolism. While his views on hermeneutics and religious matters were largely conservative, his original ideas and research on the origin of language earn him a place among pioneers of linguistics. Court de Gébelin presented dictionaries of etymology, what he called a universal grammar, and discourses on the origins of language. His volumes were so popular he republished them separately, as Histoire naturelle de la parole, ou Précis de l'Origine du Langage & de la Grammaire Universelle ("Natural History of Speech, or a Treatise on the Origins of Language and of Universal Grammar"), in Paris, 1776.

With regard to mythology and symbology, he discussed the origins of allegory in antiquity and recreated a history of the calendar from civil, religious, and mythological perspectives.

== The tarot ==
De Gébelin wrote an essay included in his Le Monde primitif, analysé et comparé avec le monde moderne ("The Primeval World, Analyzed and Compared to the Modern World"), volume viii, 1781. The chapter on Tarot with which his name is indelibly associated is a single section in his vast compendium that he published in series from 1773, to a distinguished list of subscribers, headed by King Louis XVI.

It was his immediate perception, the first time he saw the Tarot deck, that it held the secrets of the Egyptians. Writing without the benefit of Champollion's deciphering of the Egyptian language, Court de Gébelin developed a reconstruction of Tarot history, without producing any historical evidence, which was that Egyptian priests had distilled the ancient Book of Thoth into these images. These they brought to Rome, where they were secretly known to the popes, who brought them to Avignon in the 14th century, whence they were introduced into France. An essay by the Comte de Mellet included in Court de Gebelin's Monde primitif is responsible for the mystical connection of the Tarot's 21 trumps and the fool with the 22 letters of the Hebrew alphabet. An essay appended to this gave suggestions for cartomancy; within two years the fortune-teller known as "Etteilla" published a technique for reading the tarot, and the practice of tarot reading was born.
