= Pamela Colman Smith =

British occultist, artist and illustrator (1878–1951)

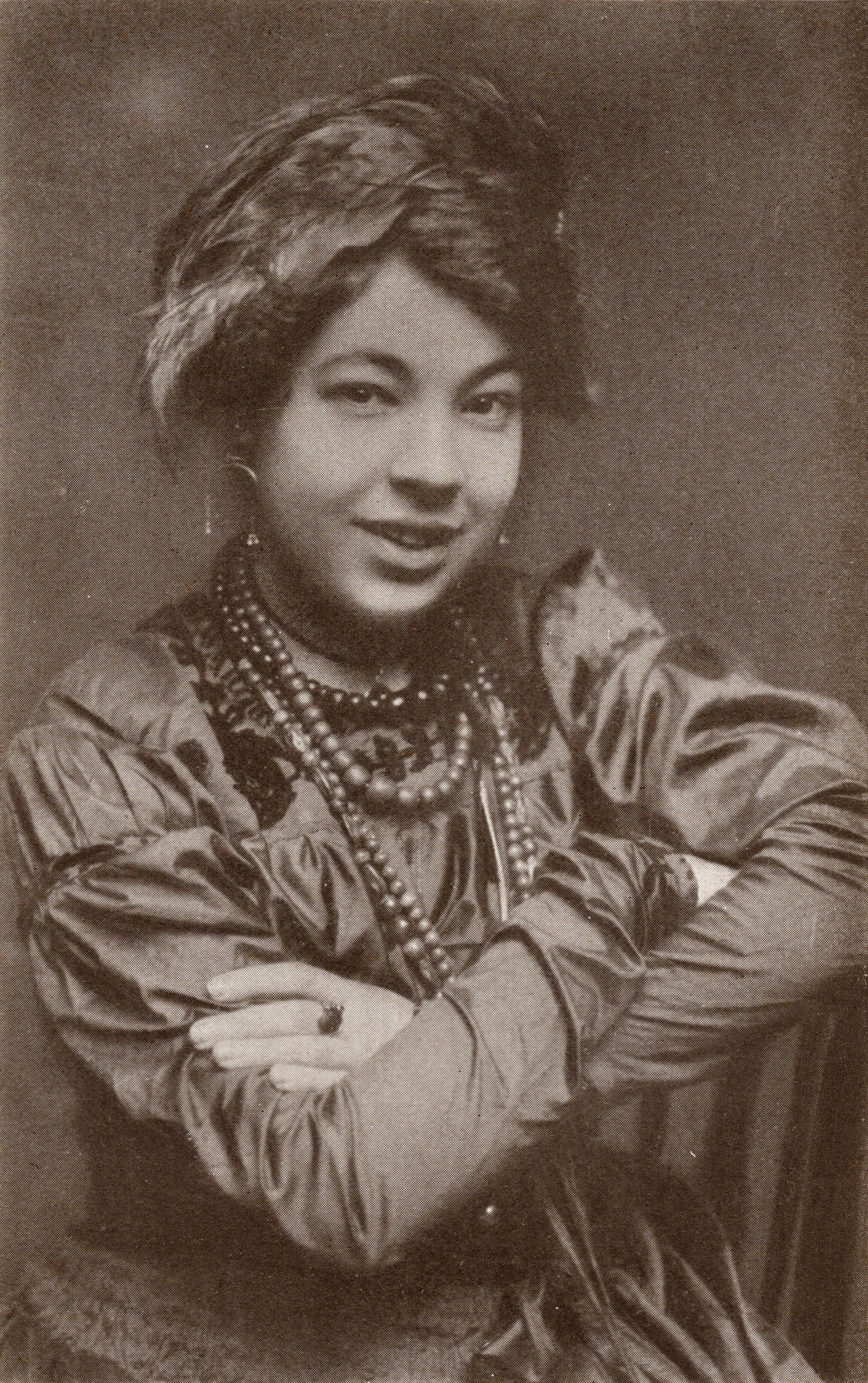
- Smith in the October 1912 issue of The Craftsman magazine
- Born: 16 February 1878; Pimlico, London, England
- Died: 16 September 1951 (aged 73); Bude, Cornwall, England
- Other name: Pixie
- Education: Pratt Institute
- Occupations: Artist, illustrator, and writer
- Known for: Waite–Smith Tarot

Pamela Colman Smith (16 February 1878 – 16 September 1951), nicknamed "Pixie", was a British artist, illustrator, writer, publisher, and occultist. She is best-known for illustrating the Rider–Waite Tarot (also known as the Rider–Waite–Smith or Waite–Smith Tarot) for Arthur Edward Waite. This tarot deck became the standard among tarot card readers, and remains the most widely used today. Smith also illustrated over 20 books, wrote two collections of Jamaican folklore, edited two magazines, and ran the Green Sheaf Press, a small press focused on women writers.

== Biography ==
Smith was born at 28 Belgrave Road in Pimlico, then in the county of Middlesex but now in the City of Westminster within central London. She was the only child of a merchant from Brooklyn, New York (before it was part of New York City), Charles Edward Smith (son of Brooklyn mayor Cyrus Porter Smith), and his wife Corinne Colman (sister of the painter Samuel Colman). The family was based in Manchester for the first decade of Smith's life. In 1889, they moved to Jamaica when Charles Smith took a job with the West India Improvement Company, a financial syndicate involved in extending the Jamaican railroad system. The Smiths lived in the capital, Kingston, for several years, traveling to London and New York.

By 1893, Smith had moved to Brooklyn, where, at the age of 15, she enrolled at the Pratt Institute, which had been founded six years earlier. There she studied art under Arthur Wesley Dow, painter, print maker, photographer, and influential arts educator. Her mature drawing style shows clear traces of the visionary qualities of fin-de-siècle Symbolism and the Romanticism of the preceding Arts and Crafts movement.

In 1896, while Smith was in art school, her mother died in Jamaica. Smith herself was ill on and off during these years and in the end left Pratt in 1897 without a degree. She became an illustrator; some of her first projects included The Illustrated Verses of William Butler Yeats, a book on actress Dame Ellen Terry by Bram Stoker, and two of her own books, Widdicombe Fair and Fair Vanity (a reference to Vanity Fair).

In 1899 her father died, leaving Smith orphaned at the age of 21. She returned to England that year, continuing to work as an illustrator, and branching out into theatrical design for a miniature theatre. In London, she was taken under the wing of the Lyceum Theatre group led by Terry (who is said to have given her the nickname 'Pixie'), Henry Irving, and Bram Stoker and traveled with them around the country, working on costumes and stage design.

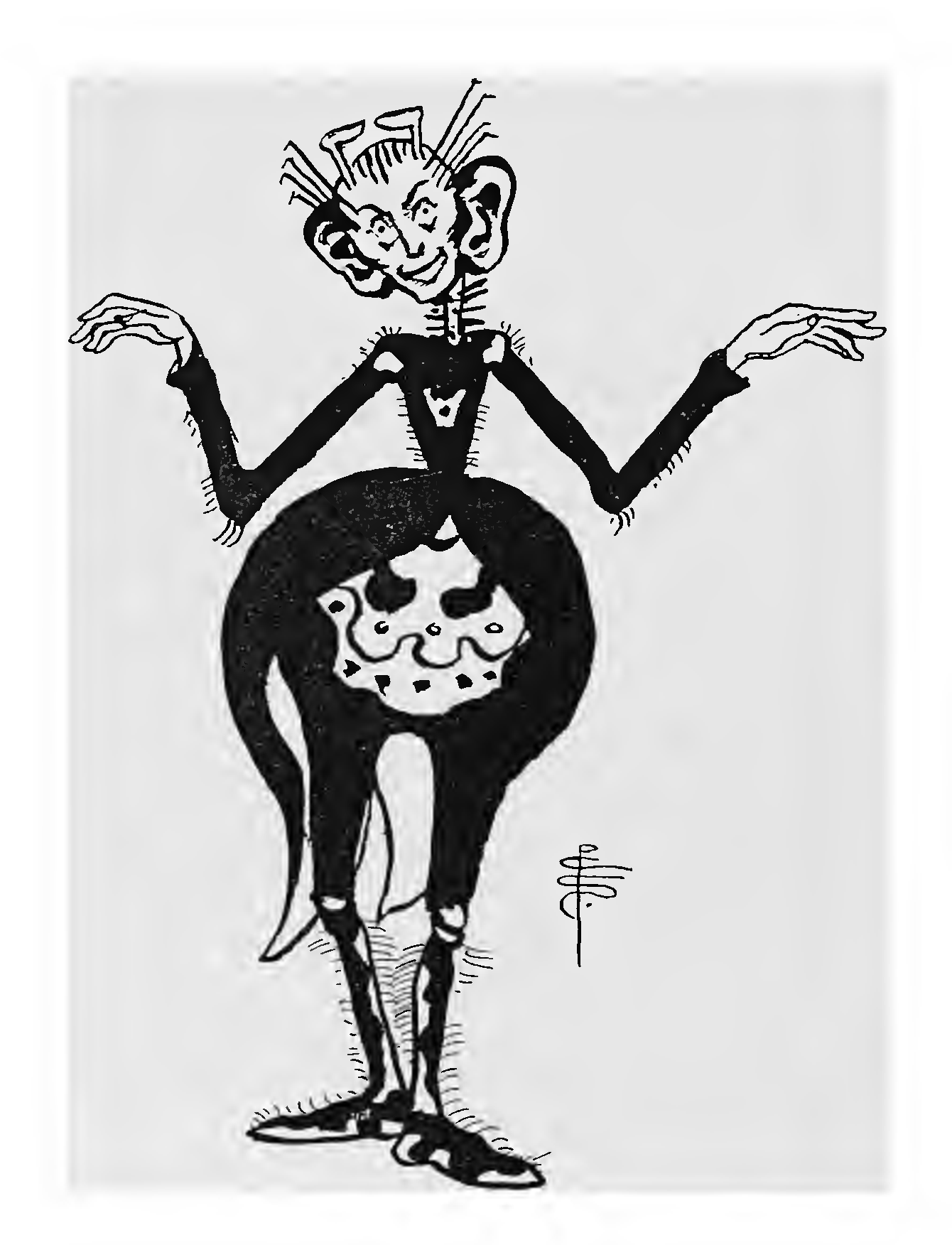
Anansi as pictured by Smith

In 1901, she established a studio in London and held a weekly open house for artists, authors, actors, and others involved with the arts. Arthur Ransome, then in his early 20s, describes one of these "at home" evenings, and the curious artistic circle around Smith, in his 1907 Bohemia in London.

Smith wrote and illustrated two books about Jamaican folklore: Annancy Stories (1899) and Chim-Chim, Folk Stories from Jamaica (1905). These books included Jamaican versions of tales involving the traditional African folk figure Anansi the Spider. She also continued her illustration work, taking on projects for William Butler Yeats and his brother, the painter Jack Yeats. She illustrated Bram Stoker's last novel, The Lair of the White Worm in 1911, and Ellen Terry's book on Diaghilev's Ballets Russes, The Russian Ballet in 1913.

Smith supported the struggle for the right to vote, and through the Suffrage Atelier, a collective of professional illustrators, she contributed artwork to further the cause of women's suffrage in Great Britain. Smith also donated her services for poster designs and toys to the Red Cross during World War I.

In 1903, Smith launched her own magazine under the title The Green Sheaf, with contributions by Yeats, Christopher St John (Christabel Marshall), Cecil French, A. E. (George William Russell), Gordon Craig (Ellen Terry's son), John Todhunter, and others. The Green Sheaf survived for a little over a year, a total of 13 issues.

Discouraged by The Green Sheaf's lack of financial success, Smith shifted her efforts towards setting up a small press in London. In 1904, she established The Green Sheaf Press which published a variety of novels, poems, fairy tales, and folktales until at least 1906, mostly by women writers.

In 1907, Alfred Stieglitz gave an exhibition of Smith's paintings in New York at his Little Galleries of the Photo-Secession (also known as gallery 291), making Smith the first painter to have a show at what had been until then a gallery devoted exclusively to the photographic avant-garde. Stieglitz was intrigued by Smith's synaesthetic sensibility; in this period, Smith would paint visions that came to her while listening to music. The show was successful enough that Stieglitz issued a platinum print portfolio of 22 of her paintings and showed her work twice more, in 1908 and 1909. Some Smith works that did not sell remained with Stieglitz and ended up in the Stieglitz/Georgia O'Keeffe Archive at Yale University.

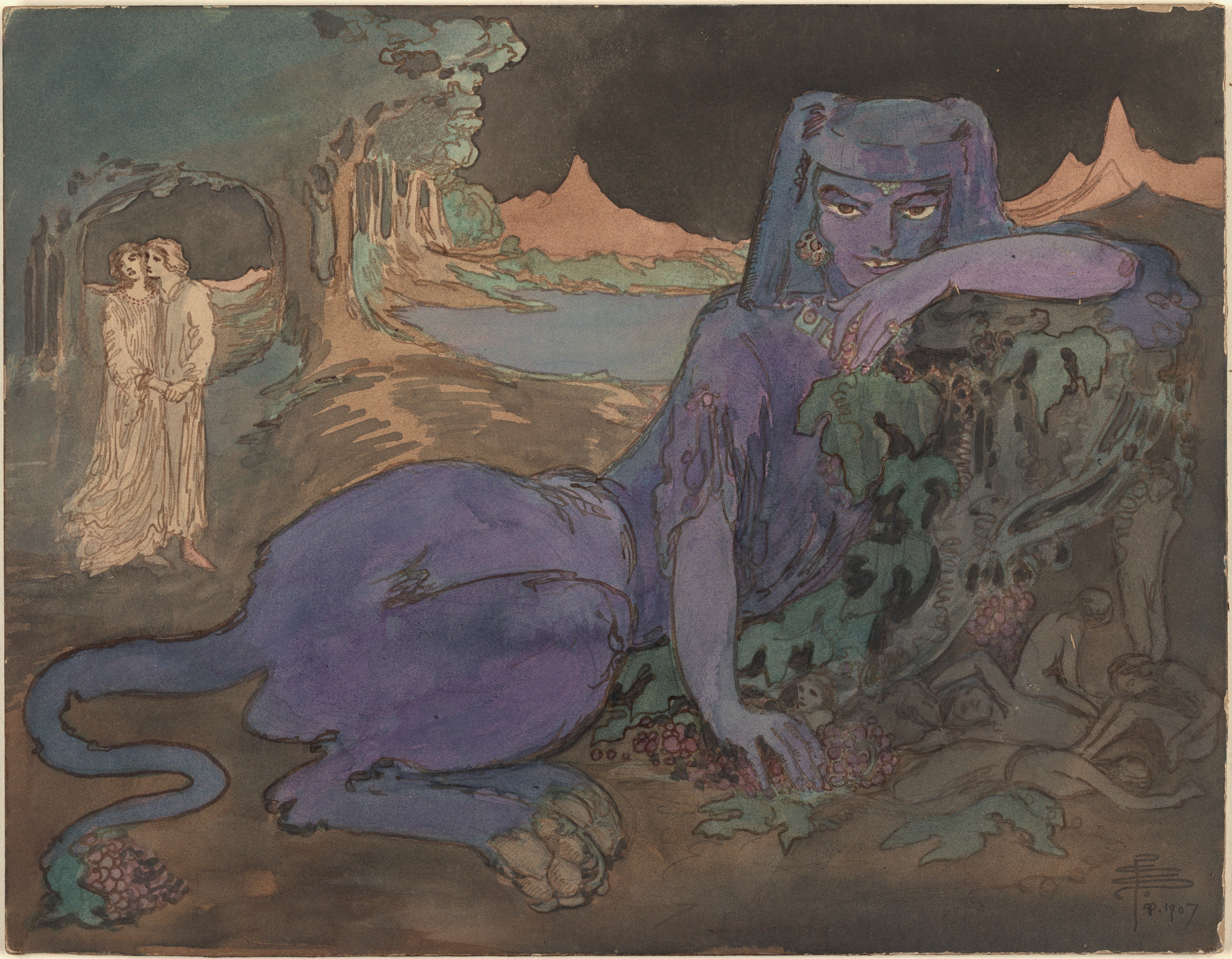
Pamela Colman Smith, The Blue Cat (1907), watercolor on paper board

Yeats introduced Smith to the Hermetic Order of the Golden Dawn, which she joined in 1901 and in the process met Arthur Edward Waite. When the Golden Dawn splintered due to personality conflicts, Smith moved with Waite to the Independent and Rectified Rite of the Golden Dawn (or Holy Order of the Golden Dawn). In 1909, Waite commissioned Smith to produce a tarot deck with appeal to the world of art, and the result was the unique Waite–Smith tarot deck. Published by William Rider & Son of London, it has endured as the world's most popular 78-card tarot deck. The innovative cards depict full scenes with figures and symbols on all of the cards including the pips, and Smith's distinctive drawings have become the basis for the design of many subsequent packs.

Apart from book illustration projects and the tarot deck, her art found little in the way of commercial outlets after her early success with Stieglitz in New York. Several examples of her works done in gouache were collected by her cousin, the American Sherlock Holmes actor William Gillette, and may be found today prominently displayed in his castle in Connecticut.

In 1911, Smith converted to Roman Catholicism. After the end of the First World War, Smith received an inheritance from an uncle that enabled her to lease a house on the Lizard Peninsula in Cornwall, an area popular with artists. For income, she established a holiday home for Catholic priests in a neighbouring house. Her long-time friend, Nora Lake, joined her in Cornwall and helped to run the vacation home.

After several years of financial difficulty, Smith left the Lizard and relocated first to Exeter in 1939, and then to Bude in the early 1940s. Although she continued writing and illustrating, she was unable to find publishers for her work, probably due to changes in public taste following the First World War.

Smith died in her apartment at the Bencoolen House in Bude on 18 September 1951. Her possessions were auctioned off to pay her debts. The location of her gravesite is unknown, but it is likely that she was buried in an unmarked grave in St. Michael's Cemetery in Bude.

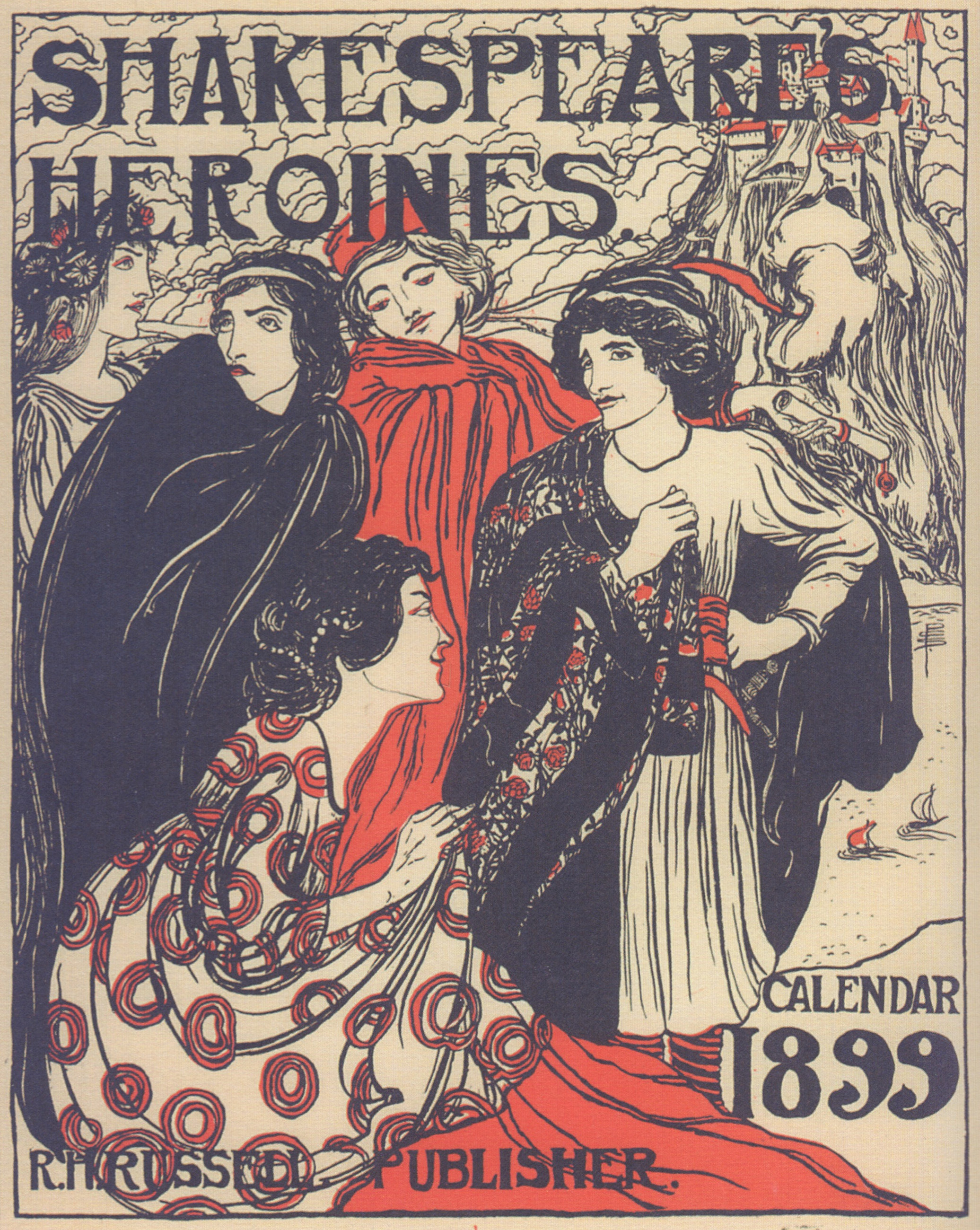
Poster by Smith advertising the "Shakespeare's Heroines" calendar (1899)

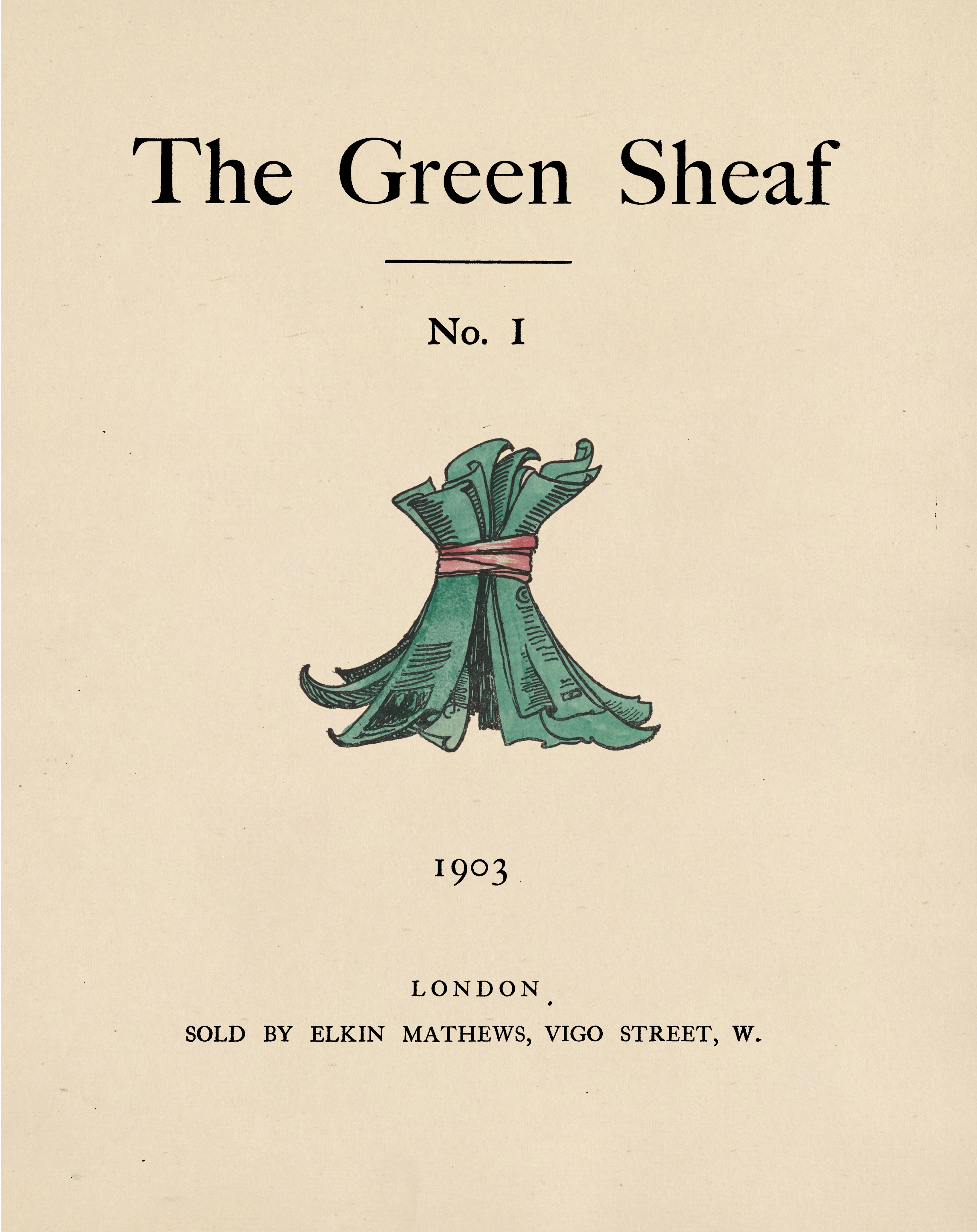
Cover of The Green Sheaf, issue 1, a literary magazine edited and published by Smith

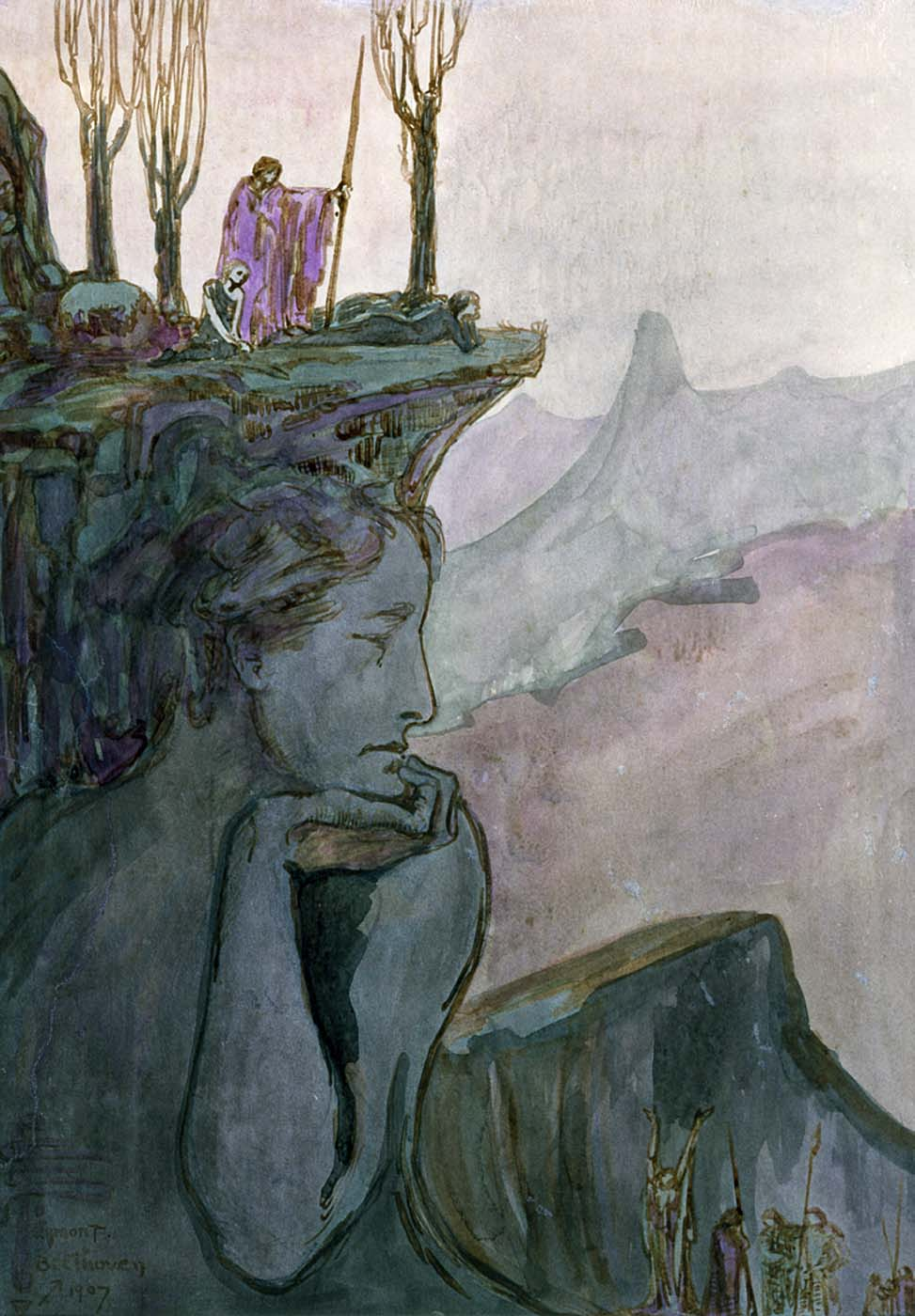
Overture. "Egmont" Beethoven, a watercolor painting by Smith (1907)

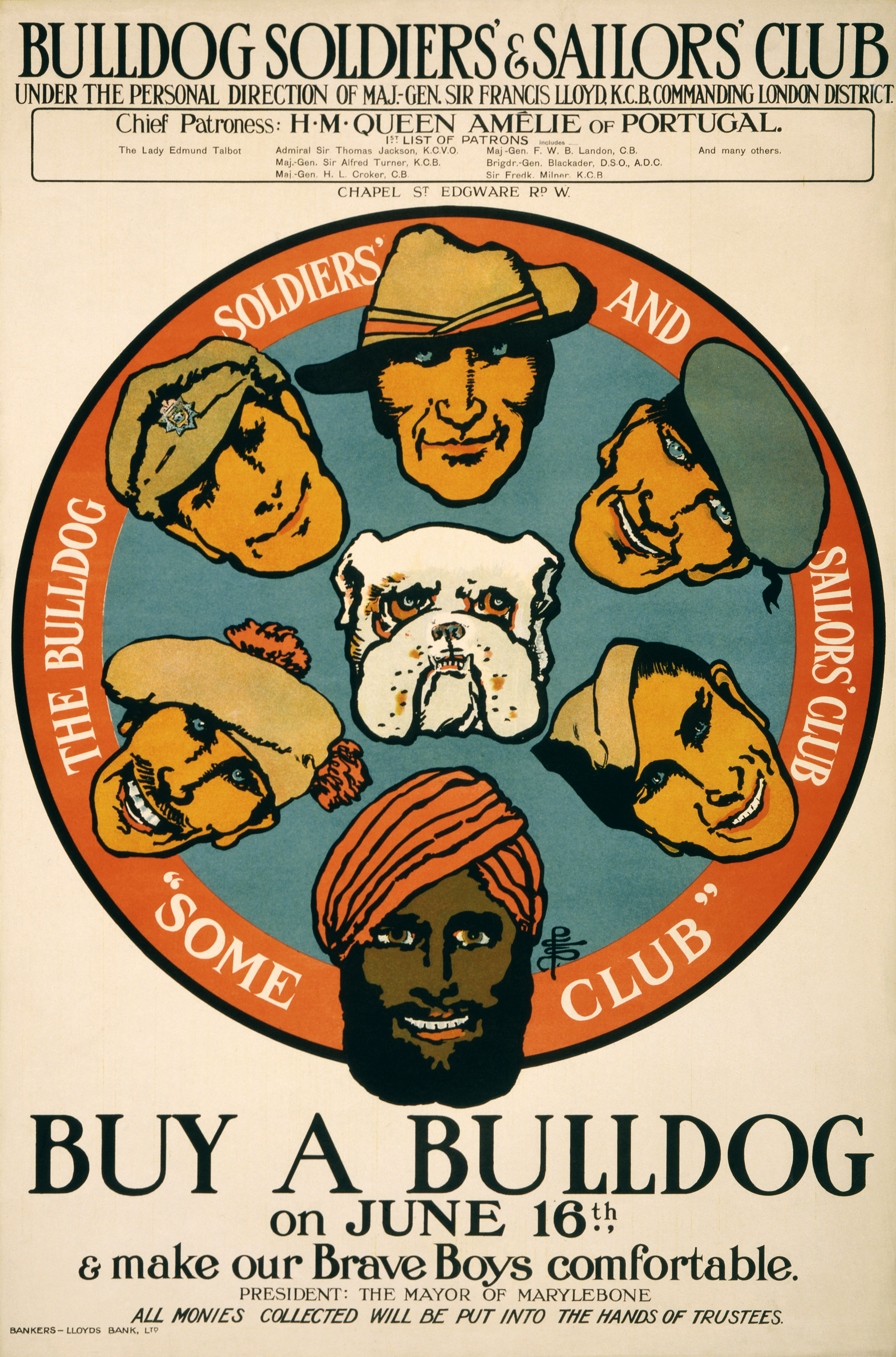
A World War I-era poster by Smith, encouraging people to buy a bulldog, with proceeds going to benefit soldiers

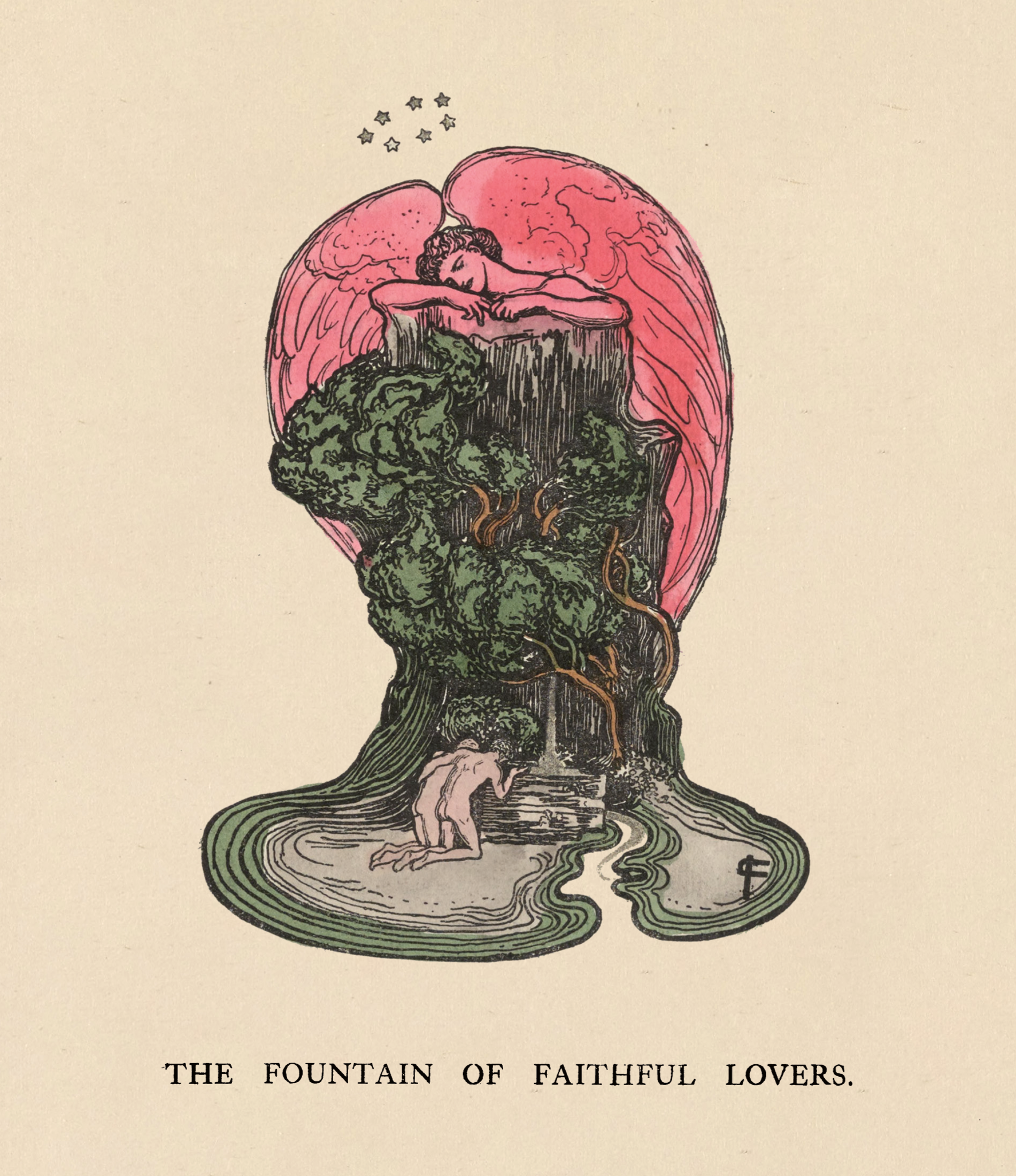
The Fountain of Faithful Lovers, an illustration by Smith from The Green Sheaf, vol. 10 (1904)

== Waite–Smith Tarot ==
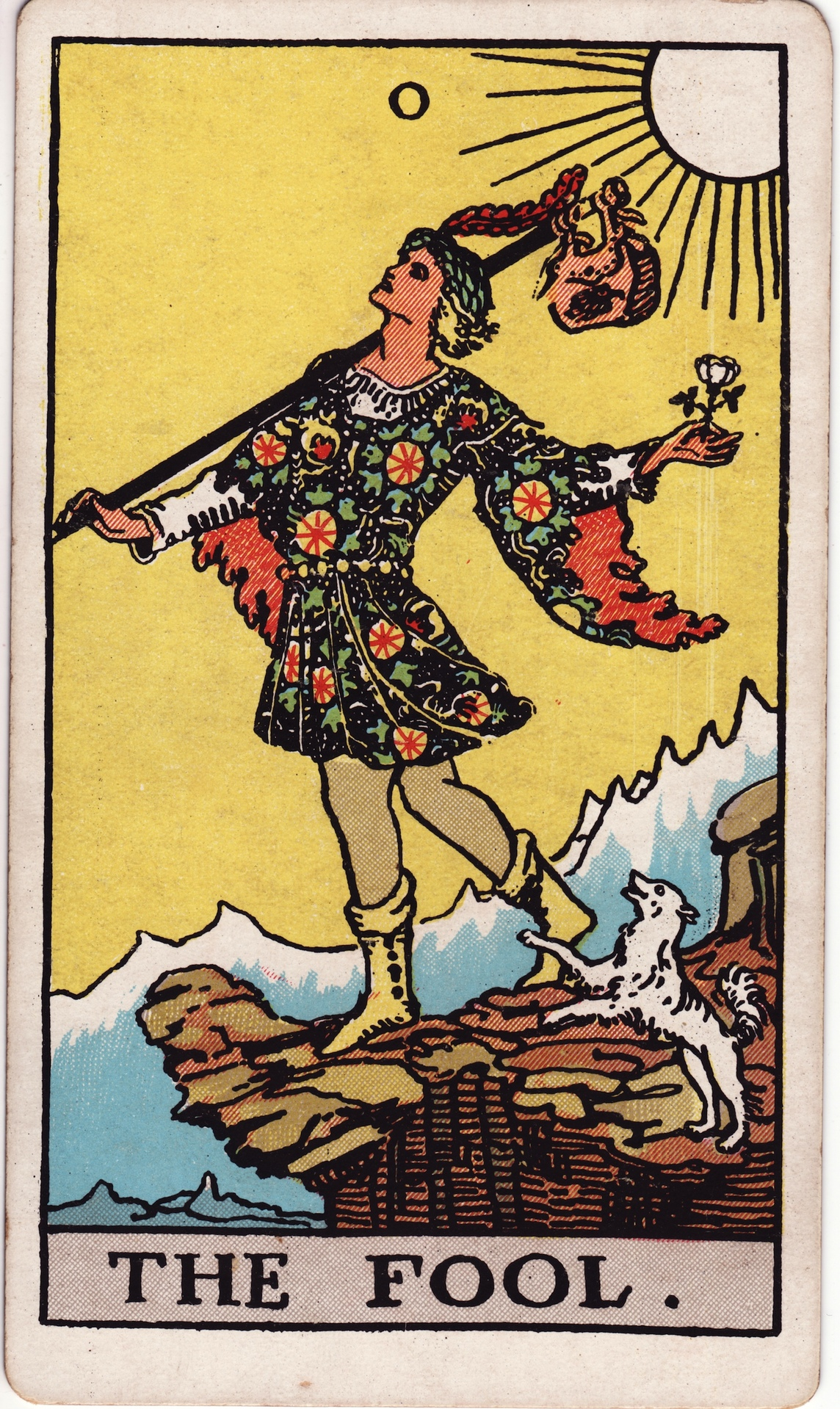
"The Fool" card from the Waite–Smith Tarot

The 78 illustrations that make up the Waite–Smith Tarot "represent archetypal subjects that each become a portal to an invisible realm of signs and symbols, believed to be channelled through processes of divination." They are original works of art and unique in terms of the cards' stylization, draftsmanship, and composition, which is a significant aesthetic achievement. They are one of the best examples of Smith's imagination for fantasy, folly, ecstasy, death, and the macabre.

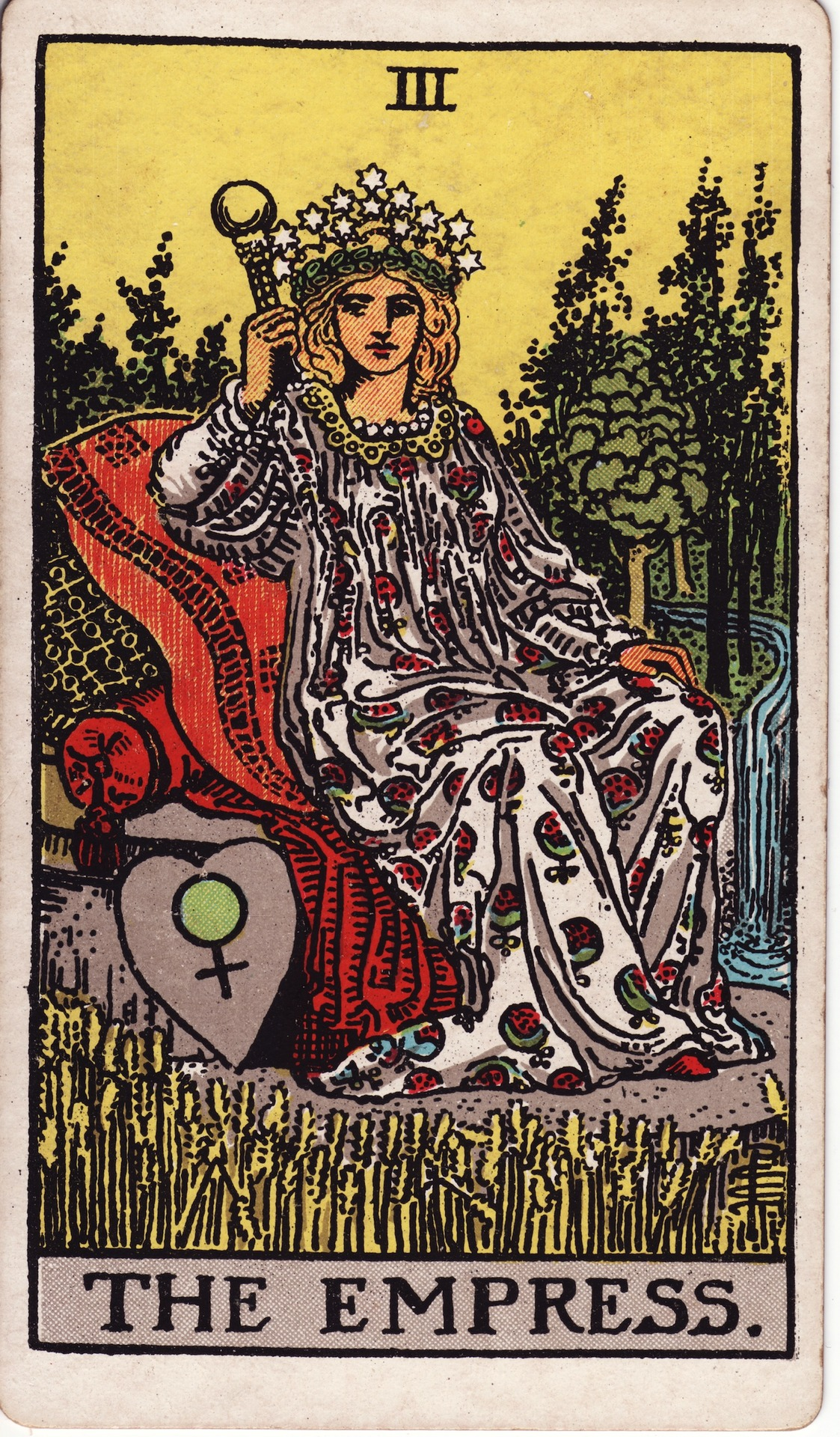
"The Empress" card from the Waite–Smith Tarot

The deck bearing Smith's illustrations, first published in England by Rider in December 1909, were simply labelled Tarot Cards and accompanied by The Key to the Tarot guide by Arthur Edward Waite. His guide was updated the following year with Smith's black-and-white drawings, and republished as The Pictorial Key to the Tarot.

U.S. Games acquired the rights to publish the deck in 1971, released variously as The Rider Tarot Deck, simply Rider Tarot, and Rider Waite Tarot. Based on differences in U.S. and U.K. copyright law, the extent of their copyright in the Waite–Smith deck is disputed. Recent scholars, recognizing the central importance of Smith's contribution, often refer to the deck as the Waite–Smith Tarot, while others prefer the abbreviation RWS, for Rider–Waite–Smith.

In the century since the deck's first printing, there have been dozens of editions put out by various publishers; for some of these the Smith drawings were redrawn by other artists, and for others the cards were rephotographed to create new printing plates. Many versions have been recolored as the coloration is rather harsh in the original deck, due to the limitations of color printing at the time. One example is the 1968 Albano–Waite Tarot, which has brighter colors overlaid on the same pen-and-ink drawings. Some recent U.S. Games editions have removed Smith's hand-drawn titles for each card, substituting text in a standard typeface. Altogether, these decks encompass the full range from editions very closely based on the original printings to decks that can at most be termed 'inspired' by the Waite–Smith deck.

Waite is often cited as the designer of the Waite–Smith Tarot, but it would be more accurate to consider him as half of a design team, with responsibility for the major concepts, the structure of individual cards, and the overall symbolic system. Because Waite was not an artist himself, he commissioned Smith to create the actual deck.

It is likely that Smith worked from Waite's written and verbal instructions rather than from sketches; that is, from detailed descriptions of the desired designs. This is how illustrators often work, and as a commercial illustrator, Smith would probably have been comfortable with such a working process. It appears that Waite provided detailed instructions mainly or exclusively for the Major Arcana, and simple lists of meanings for the Minor Arcana or 'pip' cards. Thus the memorable scenes of the Minor Arcana owe largely to Smith's own invention. The Minor Arcana are one of the notable achievements of this deck, as most earlier tarot decks, especially those of the Marseilles type, have extremely simple pip cards. Smith's innovative illustrations for the Minor Arcana, with their rich symbolism, made the Waite–Smith deck a widely imitated model for other tarot decks.

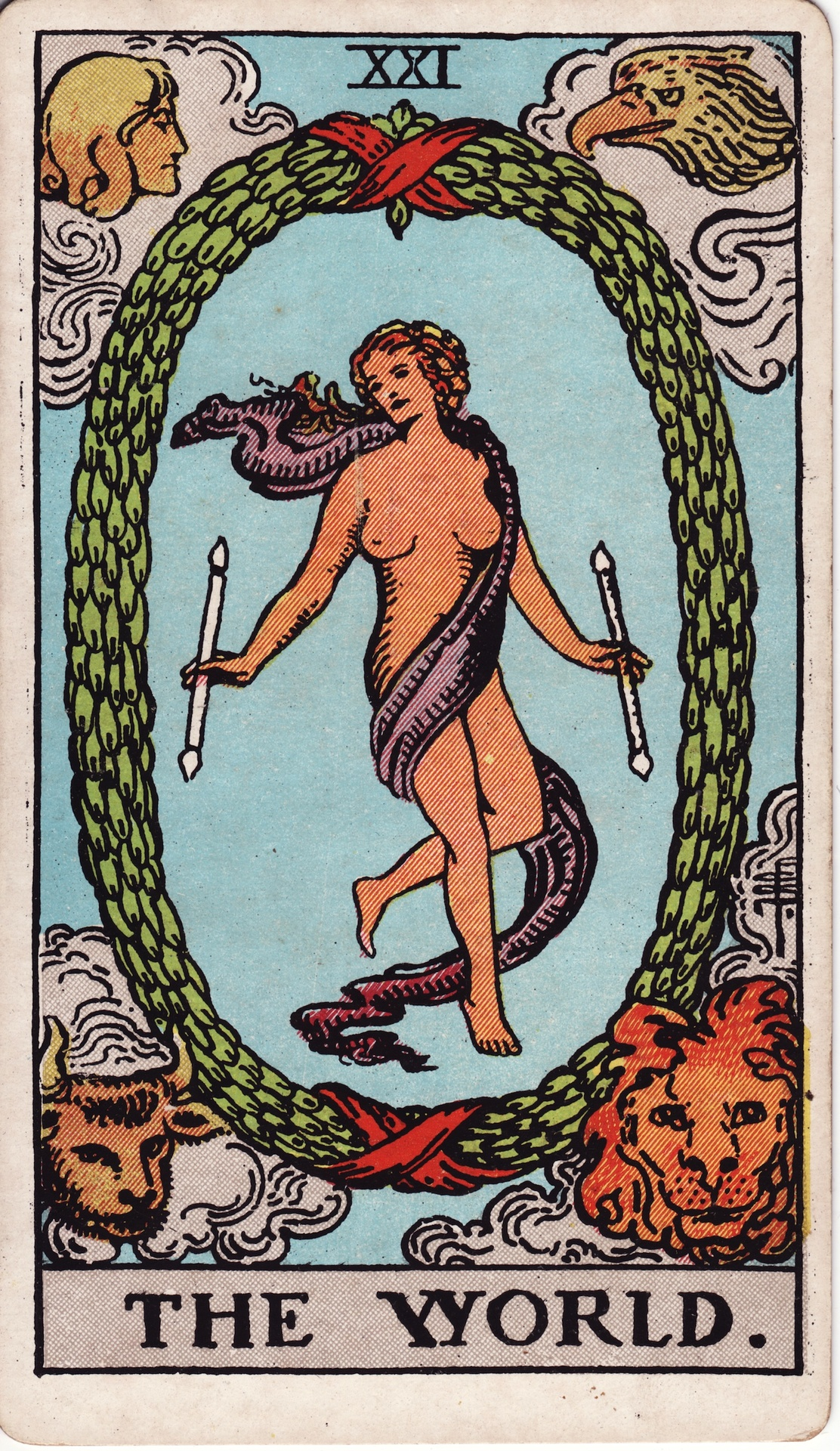
"The World" card, based on Florence Farr, from the Waite–Smith Tarot

Smith and Waite drew on a number of sources as inspirations for the deck's designs. In particular, it appears that Waite took his inspiration for the trumps mainly from the French Tarot of Marseilles. The oldest date from the 16th century, with his model possibly being a Marseilles deck from the 18th century. It is not unlikely that other Marseilles-type Italian tarot decks from the 18th or 19th century were used as additional models. For the pips, it appears that Smith drew mainly on the 15th century Italian Sola Busca tarot; the 3 of Swords, for example, clearly shows the congruity between the two decks. In addition, there is evidence that some figures in the deck are portraits of Smith's friends, notably actresses Ellen Terry (the Queen of Wands) and Florence Farr (the World).

Smith completed the art for the deck in the six months between April and October 1909. This is a short period of time for an artist to complete some 80 pictures, the number claimed by Smith in a letter to Stieglitz in 1909 and closely corresponding to the standard 78-card tarot deck. The illustrations were most likely done in pen and ink, possibly over a pencil underdrawing; the original drawings are lost so this cannot be determined with certainty at present. They were either coloured with watercolour by Smith or coloured by someone else after the fact.

== Posthumous exhibitions ==
The exhibition To All Believers—The Art of Pamela Colman Smith was held in the United States in 1975, sponsored by the University of Delaware and the Delaware Art Museum in association with the Delaware chapter of The Victorian Society in America. The exhibition was held at the Delaware Art Museum from 11 September to 19 October, and at the Art Museum, Princeton University, from 4 November to 7 December.

An exhibition, Georgia O'Keeffe and the Women of the Stieglitz Circle, was held in 2007–2008. It was at three museums: the Georgia O'Keeffe Museum in Santa Fe, New Mexico; the High Museum of Art in Atlanta, Georgia; and the San Diego Museum of Art in San Diego, California. The exhibition included works by Smith and other women artists who were active in the art and photography scene prior to O'Keeffe. Their works help to put O'Keeffe's art in the context of the time. The exhibition was based on the scholarly book Modernism and the Feminine Voice: O'Keeffe and the Women of the Stieglitz Circle by Kathleen Pyne, which contains a chapter on Smith.

The Brooklyn Campus of the Pratt Institute Libraries mounted the exhibition Pamela Colman Smith: Life and Work in 2019, including books, prints, reproductions of paintings and illustrations, tarot decks, and photographs.

== Academic study ==
In 2022, Smith's life and work became the subjects of The Queen of Wands: The Story of Pamela Colman Smith, the Artist Behind the Rider-Waite Tarot Deck, an illustrated biography by Cat Willett.
