= U.S. Games Systems =

American publisher of cards and games

U.S. Games Systems, Inc.
- Industry: publisher of books, playing cards, games, and tarot cards
- Founded: 1968
- Founder: Stuart R. Kaplan
- Headquarters: Stamford, Connecticut, United States
- Website: https://www.usgamesinc.com/

U.S. Games Systems, Inc. (USGS) is a publisher of playing cards, tarot cards, and games located in Stamford, Connecticut. Founded in 1968 by Stuart R. Kaplan, it has published hundreds of different card sets, and about 20 new titles are released annually. The company's product line includes children's card games, museum products, educational cards, motivational cards, tarot cards, and fortune telling decks. These are marketed through a network of retailers, including bookstores, museum gift shops, metaphysical shops, greeting card stores; toy and game stores; hobby shops, and mail order catalogs.

The company started as a U.S. distributor of European tarot decks such as the Swiss 1JJ Tarot. The tarot decks sold well in bookstores and Kaplan decided to begin publishing tarot decks himself. In 1971, the company acquired the rights to publish the Rider–Waite tarot deck. The deck was extremely popular and served as the basis for the company's early success.

Other tarot sets published by U.S. Games include a traditional Tarot of Marseilles, two Visconti–Sforza tarot decks, an Oswald Wirth tarot, and the Thoth Tarot designed by Aleister Crowley and drawn by Lady Frieda Harris. The company is also known for its commitment to novel interpretations of the tarot, featuring new artwork in a variety of styles and formats. Some of the best known of these are the hippie-influenced Aquarian tarot, the borderless Morgan–Greer tarot, the circular Motherpeace tarot, and the Tarot of the Witches by Fergus Hall, which was featured in the James Bond movie Live and Let Die.

Popular playing card games published by U.S. Games include the Wizard Card Game, Authors, the Natural World Series, American Revolution and American Civil War Games, the Creative Whack Pack, Mystery Rummy, and Continuo. Some of the company's card decks make use of museum holdings of artwork, like the Mummy Deck, from the holdings of the Museum of Fine Arts in Boston, and the Women in Works of Art deck, drawn from the National Portrait Gallery in Washington.

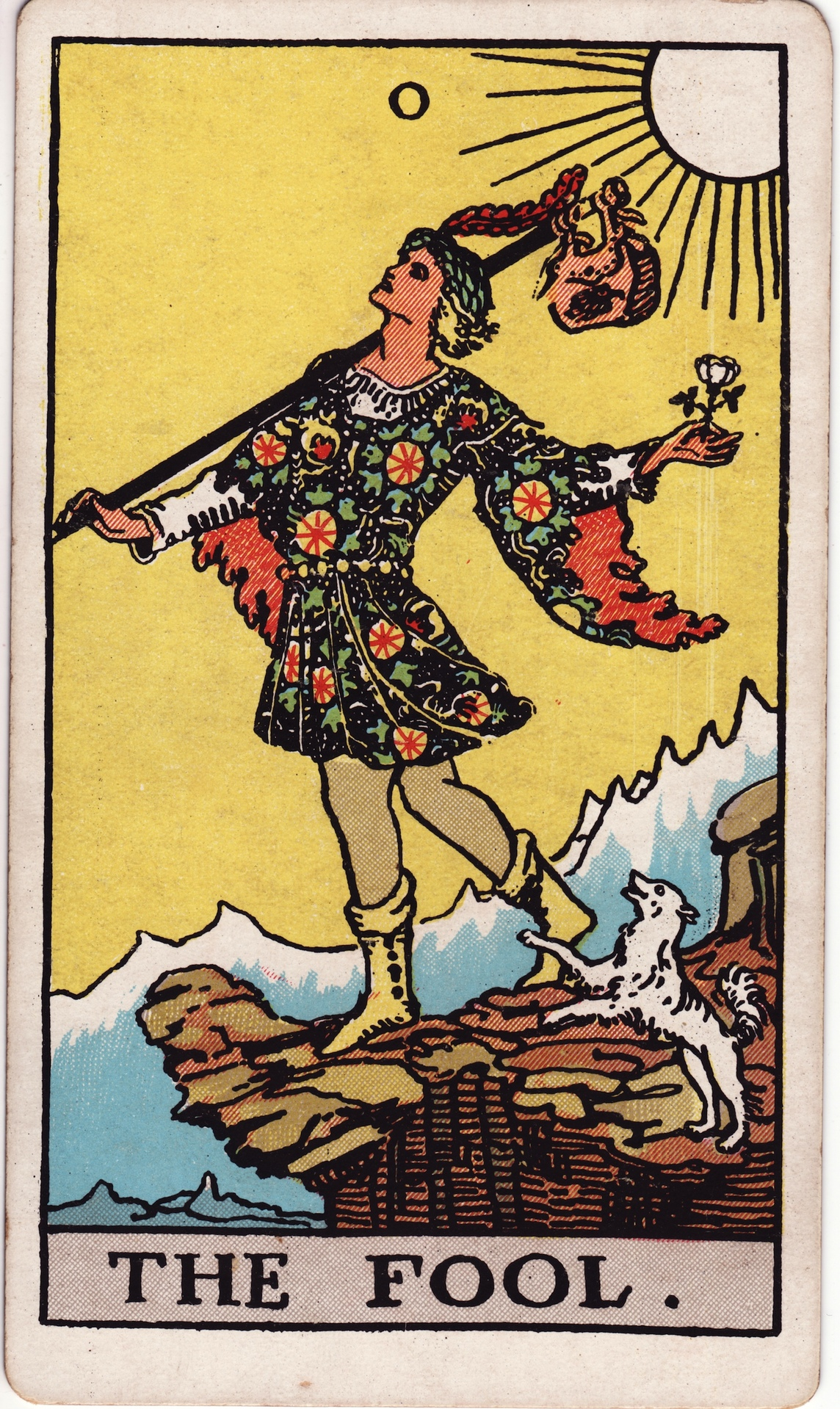
The company's logo is based on Pamela Colman Smith's drawing of The Fool tarot card

In the 1970s, the company branched out into publishing books about the history of tarot. Stuart Kaplan co-wrote with Jean Huets the four-volume Encyclopedia of Tarot, which was published over the course of two decades. In 2009, U.S. Games published a commemorative Rider–Waite box set including Pamela Colman Smith's tarot cards, a selection of her art prints, and a short book about her, written by Kaplan. Kaplan's interest in Colman Smith's work as a theatrical set designer and costumer, her involvement with the Hermetic Order of the Golden Dawn, and her collaboration with the noted occultist Arthur Edward Waite on the Rider–Waite deck, led him to research and co-write the biography Pamela Colman Smith: The Untold Story with Mary Katherine Greer, Elizabeth Foley O'Connor, and Melinda Boyd Parsons.

The company's logo is a silhouette of The Fool tarot card, taken from the drawing by Colman Smith for the Rider–Waite Tarot.

== See also ==
- Mystery Rummy: Murders in the Rue Morgue
