= Literature (card game) =

Card game

- Alternative name: Canadian Fish, Russian Fish
- Type: Exchanging
- Family: Quartet group
- Players: 6 or 8
- Skills: Matching, memory
- Cards: 48
- Deck: French-suited English pattern
- Playing time: 15–30 minutes
- Chance: Medium-High skill

Related games
- Happy Families

Literature is a card game for 6 or 8 players in two teams using a shortened version of the standard 52-card pack. The game is sometimes called Fish or Canadian Fish, after the similar Go Fish, or Russian Fish. It is played in southern India and in parts of North America.

== Rules ==
The following rules are based on John McLeod's version at pagat.com:

=== Overview ===
The game is played by six or eight players in two teams. A group of six is best and is the standard in the Canadian game. Players sit in alternating order. Four 8's are removed from a standard French-suited 52-card English pattern pack to leave 48 cards. There are thus eight half-suits of six cards each called sets or books such as "Low Spades" (♠2 ♠3 ♠4 ♠5 ♠6 ♠7) or "High Hearts" (♥9 ♥10 ♥J ♥Q ♥K ♥A).

=== Objective ===
The objective is to win more books than the other team.

=== Deal ===
Deal and play are assumed to be to the left i.e. clockwise. The first dealer is selected at random by e.g. drawing cards, highest deals. Dealer shuffles and deals all the cards out, individually and face down, beginning with the player to the dealer's immediate left. If six play, they will each receive 8 cards; if eight play, 6 cards. When the deal is finished players pick up and look at their own cards.

=== Play ===
Usually, the dealer goes first. When it is a player's turn, the player may ask a question of any member of the opposing team as follows:

- A specific card must be requested e.g. "I would like the 7 of Spades"
- The player must hold a card that is part of the requested book
- The player being asked must hold at least one card
- The player may not ask for a card already held
- The player may not ask a teammate for a card

Example: Anna only has one Diamond in her hand – the ♦J. She may ask for the ♦9, ♦10, ♦Q, ♦K or ♦A, but not the ♦J or any of the lower Diamonds.

The called player must hand over the called card, face up, if held. The caller then has another turn and may ask another question of any desired opponent. If the called player does not have the called card, the turn ends and the called player has the next turn.

=== Claiming and winning books ===
A player who has collected an entire book, can lay it down, face up, and win it for the team. If a book is split between team members, a player can claim it when it is that player's turn, by saying "Claim" and declaring the cards held by each team member. (Note: In Canadian Fish, a player gets to say "Declare" instead of "Claim".) For example, George says:

Claim! Low Spades, I have the 4 and 2, Mary has the 3, and Joseph has the 5, 6, and 7.

The players holding those cards then reveal them and, if George is right, his team wins the book called "Low Spades". If he is wrong because an opponent holds one of the cards, the opposing team wins the book. If his team holds the whole book, but George gets the distribution wrong because Mary has the 3 and 7 and Joseph has 5 and 6, then the book is forfeited and neither team scores for it.

A player does not need to hold any of the book in order to make a claim. A won book is stacked in front of a member of the winning team. (Note: Presumably, a forfeited book is laid to one side)

At any stage a player may ask what the last question and answer was, but no information about earlier ones may be discussed. Players may ask how many cards another player has. They may not keep any written records about the game.

=== Ending ===
A player who runs out of cards drops out of the game, unless this has arisen because that player has made a claim. In the latter case, the player may pass the turn to any teammate who still has cards.

When a whole team runs out of cards, their opponents must try to claim the remaining books. If it is the turn of one of their team members, that player must do this alone. If it is the turn of the side that ran out of cards, the player whose turn it was, chooses an opponent with cards who must then make the remaining claims.

=== Winning ===
Once all the books are claimed, the winners are the team with more books than the others. If both teams have 4 books, it is a tie.

== Strategy ==
Since players can only ask for cards they do not possess in a book of which they have other cards, others can deduce the card or set of cards a player has. The best strategy is for players to divulge as much information as possible to their teammates while simultaneously giving away as little information as possible to their opponents. Thus good strategy consists not only of asking for cards that one needs, but in not prematurely divulging the existence of all the books one has. Players need both strategy and memory skills to win the game.

Another common strategy is the 'stalemate breaker'. If members of a team come to the conclusion that all the cards in a set are all held by their team and they can correctly attribute them, they don't declare the book immediately. This book is kept as a stalemate breaker. If at a later point in the game a player in that team is on the verge of finishing a book (i.e. he knows which opponent has which card) but is cannot get a turn, the stalemate-breaker is used. A teammate, whose turn it is, can declare the stalemate breaking book and pass the turn onto the player who was stuck.

== Variations ==
Several variations exist, based on how cards are grouped into books:

- Other cards can be eliminated from the pack instead of the 8s e.g. 2s or 7s.
- The game can be played with 54 cards by adding the 2 jokers. The two jokers plus the four cards that are normally removed would form their own half-suit. Thus having nine half-suits makes it impossible for the two teams to tie; unless one of the sets is lost as a null set (depending on house rules; see below). The final amount would only consist of 8 sets.
- One variant uses sets of four cards with matching numbers rather than lows and highs of suits. This would result in 13 sets each having the same face value.

In addition, several house rules may be enforced, depending on the players:

- Players may be required to declare a book as soon as they hold all the cards of that book.
- Players may be required to announce when they have one card remaining, or announce and retire if they have no cards remaining.
- A high book scores twice as many points as a low book.
- A variant played by some advanced players is to allow people to ask for cards they already possess, in order to confuse opponents. This variant is not very common among most players, because it can make the game very complicated and confusing.
- When a book is declared, the team gets to choose who gets to ask next. It is used to transfer the chance to a teammate, if needed.
- Players may claim a book on any player's turn.
