= The World (tarot card) =

Tarot card of the Major Arcana

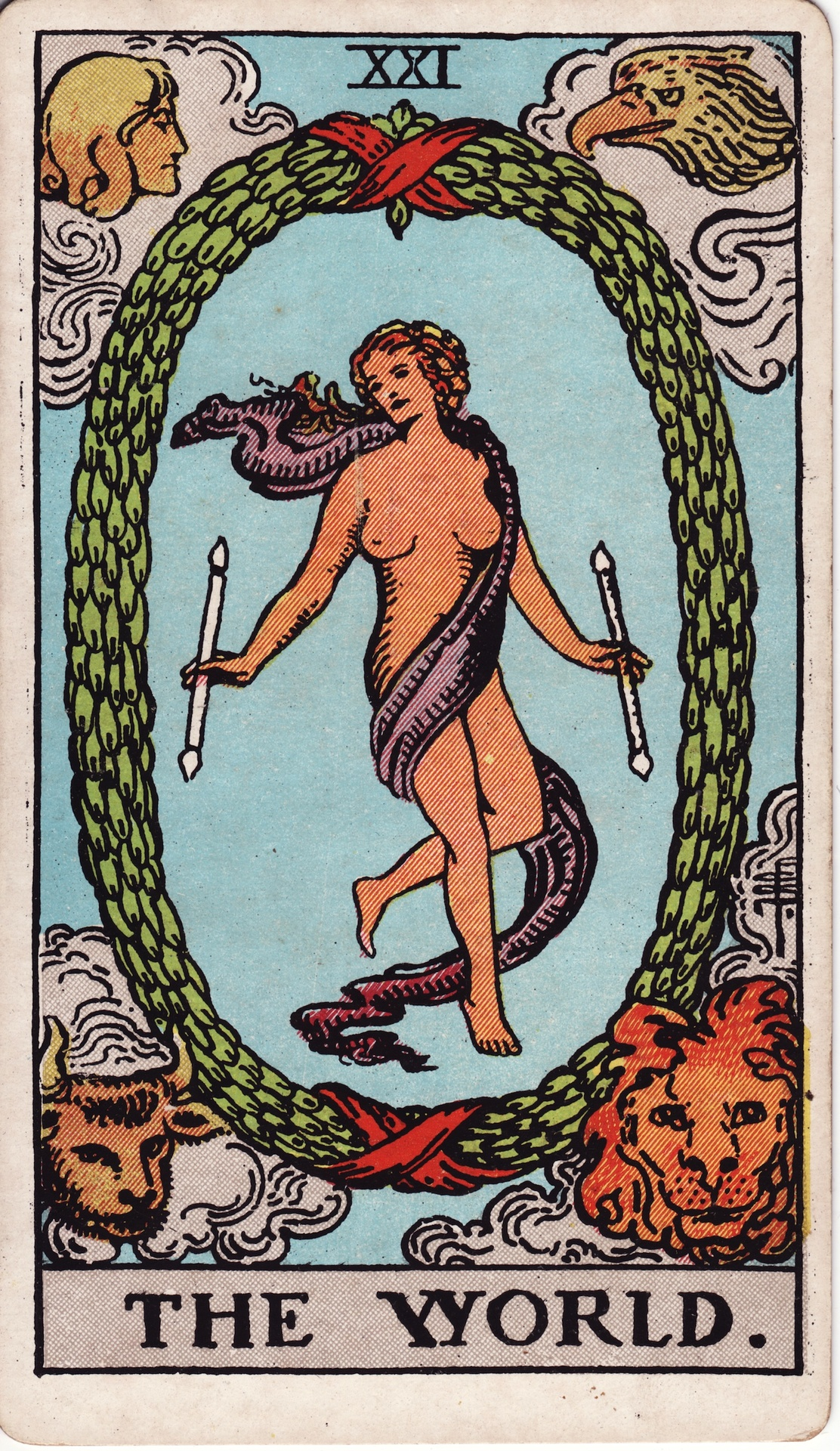
The World (XXI), Waite–Smith tarot deck

The World (XXI) is the 21st trump or Major Arcana card in the tarot deck. It can be incorporated as the final card of the Major Arcana or tarot trump sequence (the first or last optioned as being "The Fool" (0)). It is associated with the 22nd letter of the Hebrew alphabet, 'taw', also spelled 'tav' or 'Taf'.

== Description ==
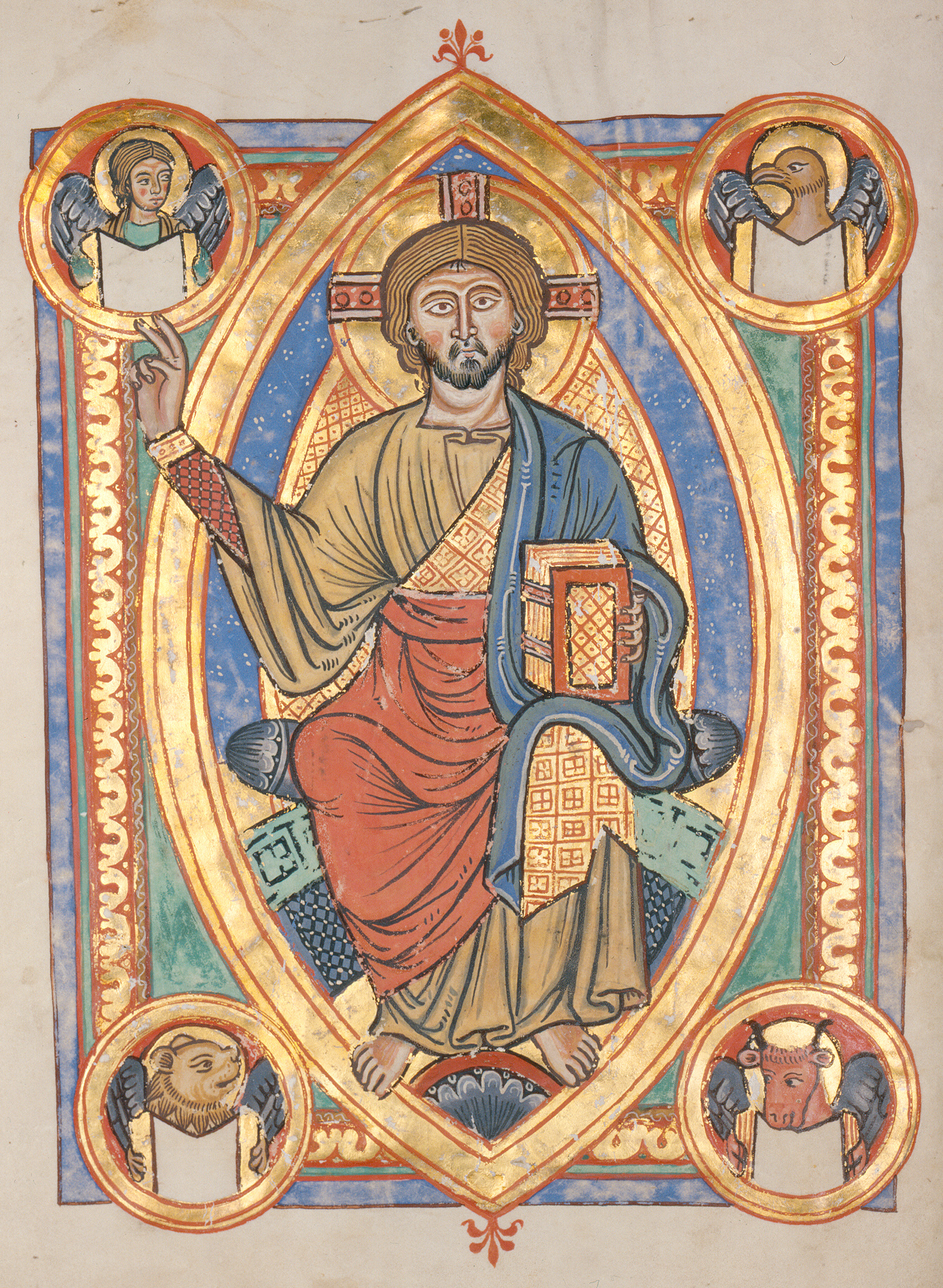
Christ in Majesty is surrounded by the animal emblems representing the four evangelists in a German manuscript.

In the traditional Tarot of Marseilles, as well as the later Rider–Waite tarot deck, a naked woman hovers or dances above the Earth holding a baton in each hand, surrounded by a wreath, being watched by the four living creatures (or hayyoth) of Jewish mythology: a man, a lion, an ox, and an eagle. This depiction parallels the tetramorph used in Christian art, where the four creatures are used as symbols of the four Evangelists. Some astrological sources explain these observers as representatives of the natural world or the kingdom of beasts. According to astrological tradition the Lion is Leo—a fire sign, the Bull or calf is Taurus—an earth sign, the Man is Aquarius—an air sign, and the Eagle is Scorpio—a water sign. These signs are the four fixed signs and represent the classical four elements.

In some decks the wreath is an ouroboros biting its own tail. In the Thoth Tarot designed by Aleister Crowley, this card is called "The Universe."

== Interpretation ==
According to A.E. Waite's 1910 book The Pictorial Key to the Tarot, the World card carries several divinatory associations:

21.THE WORLD—Assured success, recompense, voyage, route, emigration, flight, change of place. Reversed: Inertia, fixity, stagnation, permanence.

The figure is male and female, above and below, suspended between the heavens and the earth. It is completeness. It is also said to represent cosmic consciousness; the potential of perfect union with the One Power of the universe. It tells us full happiness is to also give back to the world: sharing what we have learned or gained. As described in the book The New Mythic Tarot by Juliet Sharman-Burke and Liz Greene (p. 82), the image of the woman (Hermaphroditus in Greek Mythology) is to show wholeness unrelated to sexual identification but rather of combined male and female energy on an inner level, which integrates opposites traits that arise in the personality charged by both energies. Opposite qualities between male and female that create turmoil in our life are joined in this card, and the image of becoming whole is an ideal goal, not something that can be possessed rather than achieved.

According to Robert M. Place in his book The Tarot, the four beasts on the World card represent the fourfold structure of the physical world—which frames the sacred center of the world, a place where the divine can manifest. Sophia, meaning Prudence or Wisdom (the dancing woman in the center), is spirit or the sacred center, the fifth element. Prudence is the fourth of the Cardinal virtues in the tarot. The lady in the center is a symbol of the goal of mystical seekers. In some older decks, this central figure is Christ, whereas in others it is Hermes. Whenever it comes up, this card represents what is truly desired.

== In popular culture ==
In the manga JoJo's Bizarre Adventure: Stardust Crusaders, tarot cards are used to name the character's powers, named 'Stands'. The main antagonist of Stardust Crusaders, DIO, has a Stand named The World, named after The World card.

In the video game series Persona, The World card is one that appears in multiple entries. In the games, various characters use beings called 'Persona' in battle with every character and persona being tied to an arcana. How the World Card was specifically tied in depends on the game. In Revelations: Persona, Persona 2: Innocent Sin, and Persona 2: Eternal Punishment, no character is tied to The World arcana, but are each given a unique arcana, however there are multiple personas who are tied to the card. beginning with Persona 3 what is essentially the inverse happens. Each of the protagonist receive The Fool Arcana near the beginning of their games which gets mirrored in the games' climax. In Persona 4 and Persona 5 the protagonists receive The World Card to symbolize the end of their journey, but in Persona 3 the protagonist receives the Thoth Deck equivalent that being The Universe. On the other hand, next to no persona are tied to The World card, with The Universe having no one.

In the second season of Mad Men (episode 12 titled "The Mountain King,") the character of Don Draper has his tarot read by his ex-wife Anna. Don inquires about The World card, and Anna describes the figure in it as "the soul of the world." When Don asks what the card means, Anna responds, "It means the only thing keeping you from being happy is the belief that you are alone."

In The House of the Dead 4, The World is the codename for the final boss of the game. The World is a creation of Caleb Goldman, the antagonist of the second game, who is made to be the ultimate being. He uses ice powers as his main forms of attacks. In the end, though he continues to evolve after each of his defeats, he is eventually defeated and destroyed by the efforts of AMS agents James Taylor and Kate Green.
