= Top Trumps =

Card game

- Winning Moves' Top Trumps logo
- Publishers: Dubreq, Waddingtons, Winning Moves
- Years active: 1978–current
- Genres: Card game
- Players: 2–6
- Setup time: 1 minute
- Playing time: 30–60 minutes
- Chance: Medium (card distribution)
- Age range: 4 and up

A card from the "Fantasy" pack: the Dragon

Top Trumps is a card game first published in 1978. Each card contains a list of numerical data, and the aim of the game is to compare these values to try to trump and win an opponent's card. A wide variety of different packs of Top Trumps has been published.

== Gameplay ==
A pack of cards is based on a theme, such as cars, aircraft, books, boats, dinosaurs, or characters from a popular film or television series. Each card in the pack shows a list of numerical data about the item. For example, in a pack based on cars, each card shows a different model of car, and the stats and data may include its engine size, its weight, its length, and its top speed. If the theme is about a TV series or film, the cards include characters and the data varying from things like strength and bravery to fashion and looks, depending on the criteria.

All the cards are dealt among the players. There must be at least two players, and at least one card for each player. The starting player (normally the player to the dealer's left) selects a category from their topmost card and reads out its value. Each other player then reads out the value of the same category from their cards. The best (usually the largest, but in the case of a sports car's weight or a sprinter's 100m time, for instance, lower is considered better) value wins the "trick", and the winner takes all the cards of the trick and places them at the bottom of their pile. The winner then looks at their new topmost card, and chooses the category for the next round.

In the event of a draw the cards are placed in the center and a new category is chosen from the next card by the same person as in the previous round. The winner of that round obtains all of the cards in the center as well as the top card from each player.

Players are eliminated when they lose their last card, and the winner is the player who obtains the whole pack. Some variants of the rules allow 'three card pick', whereby a player who has only 3 cards remaining is allowed to choose any of their three cards to play with. Typically, this lengthens the game considerably.

== History ==
German company Altenburg-Stralsunder launched their own brand of trumps known as Ace Trumps in 1976/77. The Dubreq Top Trumps was a card game popular with adults and children in the United Kingdom in the 1970s and 1980s, especially among boys, for whom it was a popular playground pastime. The topics tended to reflect this, and included military hardware, modes of transport and racing cars. The packs tended to be priced so that children could collect new packs by saving pocket money for a few weeks.

The original Top Trumps was launched in 1978, with eleven different packs selling at 50p each, published by a company named Dubreq. Dubreq was also known for the Stylophone. Dubreq was taken over by Waddingtons in 1982, and they continued manufacturing packs until the early 1990s. The packs from this period are now collectable.

== Winning Moves UK and Winning Moves Germany ==
=== Modern relaunch ===
In 1992 the rights to the game were purchased by Winning Moves UK, who relaunched the game. The topics covered are more diverse, and include:

- Vehicles: Supercars, Racing Trucks, Motorbikes and Scooters
- Military Hardware: Warships, Ultimate Military Jets
- Scientific: Space Phenomena, Dinosaurs
- Engineering: Skyscrapers
- Wildlife: Predators, Sharks, Wildlife/Sealife in Danger, Deadly 60
- Pets: The Dog, Dogs Trust
- Sports: Football, Cricket, Lacrosse, Rugby, WWE Wrestling, NBA
- Entertainment: Movie Stars, Punctuation, Smash Hits Pop Stars (x3), The X Factor
- Book Characters: The World of Roald Dahl: Goodies and Baddies, Jacqueline Wilson
- Comics: The Beano, Marvel Super Heroes & Villains (x17), DC Super Heroes (x2)
- Television Series: The Simpsons (x4), 24, Top Gear, Little Britain, Buffy, Angel, Doctor Who (x4), Star Wars: Clone Wars, Power Rangers (x4), Merlin, Only Fools and Horses
- Films: The Lord of the Rings (x3), Star Wars (x5), The Chronicles of Narnia, Harry Potter (x6), Transformers (x2), Disney Pixar
- Themed: Horror, Halloween

In these new packs a description or biography of the item on each card is included, as well as the statistics and numerical data. The cards may deliver camouflaged learning, or learning through play, as reading about the facts on the cards, and enhancing memory and maths skills through the use of comparing the data, adds an educational benefit.

Many of the packs are, like their predecessors, becoming collectable, especially those sold for limited times (such as those associated with films), or which were specially commissioned as promotional packs.

Winning Moves UK split their packs into categories based on licenses and the age range they are aimed at. The categories used include Classics (packs not requiring a license and those before Winning Moves UK started categorising their packs), Specials (sold for more for reasons such as needing a license), Juniors (aimed at a younger audience, with only 24 cards instead of the 30 and cases of a different shape) and Limited Editions (packs which have a limited stock and are 'For Big Kids'). They have also introduced a new range called Very Specials which has had two packs so far, the Royal Wedding pack and the upcoming Festivals pack.

Winning Moves UK have also released some Collectors Edition packs including multiple packs in a set. The Collectors Editions include "The Lord of the Rings Trilogy Gift Set" including the three Lord of the Rings decks and nine exclusive Super Top Trumps cards. A "Doctor Who 45 Years of Time Travel" pack has also been released.

A "Wedding Pack" created for the director of Winning Moves, Tom Liddell, was distributed at his wedding. A very small number was produced, and the sentimental value to the limited owners renders the Wedding Pack the rarest pack.

There are multiple football packs released each year, for clubs including Manchester United, Arsenal, Chelsea and Liverpool. One-off packs for Newcastle United, Tottenham Hotspur, Hull City, and Everton have also been released.

Winning Moves UK also released two Politicos packs, one in 2007 and one in 2008. These were given out at political party conferences, and featured politicians such as Tony Blair and Gordon Brown.

There have been two Ultimate Packs released by Winning Moves UK. These are the Red and the Black packs. The red one is older than the black and is now out of print. These were not available in shops and were only available by winning the Monthly Prize Draw on the Top Trumps website.

Many of the newer packs (late 2008 onwards) have a "Summit Challenge" game on the reverse of the bar code card. These cards have questions with boxes to put answers in on the information about the pack.

A special 'Cool Christmas' pack was given out to members of the Top Trumps forums. This had 19 playing cards and a 10% discount for cultandcool.com inside as well as a message from Top Trumps.

Since 2017, the manufacturing of Top Trumps packs has taken place at St Austell Printing Company, St Austell, Cornwall.

=== International packs ===
==== Exclusives ====
Different countries sometimes make exclusive packs for that country or others that speak the same language. Some of these are for TV shows or other things exclusive to that country although there are some packs that would be popular elsewhere, such as the French Scooby-Doo and French, German, Italian and Belgian Asterix pack.

English-speaking countries have sold some of their packs through the online Top Trumps shop and were unavailable elsewhere. These are the All Blacks pack, only available in New Zealand and the Cricket Australia pack, only available in Australia. Only 500 of each were imported and sold in the shop.

These two packs were exclusive to the US until they proved to be quite popular so they were sold in the UK. There are some variations to the cards in the packs between the American ones and the English ones.

- Sealife in Danger available in the US.
- Wildlife in Danger available in the US.

There were 300 of the US Wildlife in Danger pack imported and sold in the PTT Shop. The American Sealife pack was never sold in the shop. An English version of the pack was printed and sold, along with the Wildlife in Danger pack.

==== UK ====
5,000 Limited Edition 'Borderlands 2' packs were created in August 2012. These cards were offered to independent video game retailers who let customers order the Borderlands 2 video game. They will never be available to purchase as a stand-alone item.

===== Scotland =====
The Scottish packs are exactly the same as other UK packs. There have been some promotional packs given out in the Daily Record, a Scottish newspaper. The packs so far are: Scottish Football The Club Collection (2007), Heroes of Scottish Football (2008), Max Speed Supercars (2009) and Marvel Ultimate Villains (2010). There are 39 cards given away as well as a tuck box in the first giveaway and a 'How To Play' card. Four cards were given away each time. The Marvel Ultimate Villains only had 40 cards to collect.

==== Iceland ====
Iceland's Top Trumps are owned by Nordic Games which is the sales department within Iceland. These packs are the same as the Winning Moves releases.

==== Japan ====
A number of packs have now been released in Japan. These are sold through vending machines, as are most Japanese cards. They come in Booster Packs from the vending machines, or you can buy boxes of the cards. The packs are:

- Kamen Rider
- Disney All Stars
- Super Sentai
- Trains
- Ultraman

These cards are unique as some of them are horizontal and some vertical. There are also 55 cards in each set instead of the normal 30. These cards are co-owned by Carddas.

==== Malta ====
Malta Winning moves had made a pack on Politics from Malta. This came with a special Smart Santa collector card, which did not have stats on and was not a Top Trumps card. There is also a promotion with the pack for the first person who gets all cards in the pack signed by the people on each card to win six free flights, courtesy of Air Malta, to any European destination.

==== United Arab Emirates ====
United Arab Emirates has released a pack based on the animated TV series Freej. This was only available in the UK through an occasional free gift. They are distributed by Pluto Games but are still Winning Moves packs.

==== United States ====
Two formerly exclusive packs were printed in the United States, which later became available around the world: "Wildlife in Danger" and "Sealife in Danger". Several booster packs of cards have been exclusively released in the United States, including two "Bugs" packs, which are due to become a stand-alone pack, "Incredible Instruments", "Mysteries", "Bronx Zoo" and "Oakland Zoo". These were sold in eight-card booster packs, with a front title card. The two zoo packs were released in limited numbers as promotional materials for their namesake zoos. Another US exclusive was the "New York" pack. They also had two Soccer packs, Soccer Stars and Soccer Stadiums.

==== Other countries ====
Other countries that Winning Moves make Top Trumps for are: Canada, France, Germany, Belgium, Portugal, Spain, Switzerland, Italy, Denmark, the Netherlands, Norway, Sweden, Turkey, Australia, New Zealand, South Africa and Iran.

Many countries only sell packs online and not in shops. A common place to buy these packs online is Amazon. A few countries have got Top Trumps shops online. These countries are: USA which delivers to Canada as well, France which delivers to Belgium and Germany as well, and also New Zealand.

Many countries have different cards in the packs that are also available in England. For example, in the US edition of horses, Morgan, Crillo and Mustang replace the cards Exmoor, Paso Fino and Unicorn in the UK edition. The US horses pack also has a totally different style compared to the UK pack. Also, front covers of packs are different. The Skyscrapers pack has a different cover in Germany, the US and the UK.

=== Super Top Trump Cards ===
A number of Top Trumps packs have Super Top Trump (STT) cards issued for them, also known as Supercards in the United States. These cards are not available with the original pack, but are found in related merchandise, events or promotions, and sometimes made available in booster packs of 2–10 cards. For example, the popular US television series 24 has a Top Trumps pack available, but its STT card is only available with the purchase of special-stickered season 4 of 24 DVDs. STT cards for the Doctor Who deck were only available with the purchase of season 2, 3 and 4 DVDs. One other Doctor Who Super Top Trump card was released with a very special edition of the Beano magazine. A number of STT cards were made available free of charge to members of the Top Trumps club through its website, prior to 2006.

Some STT cards are rarer than others. Most of the STT cards made available via the web tend to be relatively common, although some earlier ones from popular pack titles, such as the Nazgûl (from the Lord of the Rings series) can attract relatively high prices. Cards made available in other promotional ways can be exceptionally rare. An example is the "Grandmamma" STT card for the Roald Dahl pack. It was given out, free, to Scouts at a charity sleepover event in 2004. Very few of these are in circulation and they are difficult to obtain even through online auctions.

Recently, several UK Super Top Trumps have been branded as "Supercards" as well.

=== Top Trumps books ===
In 2006, and working in conjunction with the Haynes publishing group, Winning Moves launched a line of books under the Top Trumps brand, based around the design and concept of the card game. The Books are often written by experts in their appropriate field. Subjects included sharks, Star Wars, Indiana Jones, Racing cars, Motorbikes, Fighter Aircraft, Cars, Doctor Who (Series 1 and 2 together, and Series 3 & 4), Dinosaurs, Airliners, Marvel Heroes, Animals, Tanks, Transformers and Football.

=== Top Trumps LIVE ===
A number of card sets can be played online against a computer opponent at the Winning Moves web sites, including two sets which is unavailable in shops. Games made include: Horror, Skyscrapers, ODI Stars (Unavailable as packs), World Football Stars, NBA 2K9, Sharks and Star Wars, Armchair General (Unavailable as packs) and Bratz.

Two LIVE games appeared on other websites. NASCAR appeared on the NASCAR website and The Boat That Rocked appeared on Facebook. Both are not available as packs. You have to log into both websites to play though.

There is also a German Star Wars: Clone Wars game and upcoming Sealife in Danger and Wildlife in Danger.

=== Mobile Top Trumps ===
Top Trumps is available through a mobile gaming service, in which users can play single player against the computer, compete against up to three friends on one mobile, or with a single opponent via a bluetooth connection. Games made include: Football Legends, Star Wars, Gumball 3000 and Moto GP and Doctor Who.

=== Top Trumps Adventures ===
A series of Top Trumps video games were released in 2007, under the title Top Trumps Adventures. Some of the packs that have been turned into games are "Horror", "Predators, "Dogs", "Dinosaurs" and "Doctor Who".

In 2012, GMG Play released "Top Trumps: NBA All Stars" for Nintendo DS and Nintendo 3DS. Unlike the vast majority of Top Trumps products, it was only released in the US.

=== Top Trumps TV ===
Top Trumps TV is a UK television programme based on Top Trumps, shown on Five in late 2008. It is hosted by Robert Llewellyn and Ashley Hames.

=== Other merchandise ===
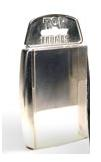
The Gunmetal Top Trumps Holder

Winning Moves UK has released other Top Trumps–related items. These include:

- Top Trumps Displayers, which can display up to ten packs. These came in a choice of four colours: purple, green, grey, and clear
- Top Trumps Ultimate Football Challenge DVD game which contains two packs; Football Legends 1 and World Football Stars as playable packs on the DVD. The DVD game comes with two video pack, trivia quizzes, a video countdown and a football Managers Top Trumps game. This last item proved to be a popular pack, and Winning Moves released it as a standalone deck.
- Lunar Jim Top Trumps cover card, released for the Space and Space Phenomena decks which was given away at the Alliance Atlantis/BBC Worldwide Lunar Jim themed promotion, 2007.
- Gunmetal Holder, a metal Top Trumps case only available to club members who win the monthly prize draw.
- 24 Gunmetal Holder. 24 of these 24 Gunmetal Holders were given out in a competition on the main website. These had the inscriptions 24 and a number out of 24 (e.g. 1/24) on the back. Only 24 of these were made.
- A Top Trumps pen was made. It had the words 'Top Trumps' and the old website, www.playaday.com written on it.
- A Top Trumps mug was also made that was yellow and had the words 'Top Trumps' written in red on it. A new mug was released with the World Football Top Trumps promotional pack.
- Top Trumps pop art prints reworking images from retro football packs including World Cup and Soccer Stars editions.

=== Pack exclusives ===
A few exclusive items came with packs. These are:

- TARDIS case which came with the Doctor Who 45 Years of Time Travel pack.
- Reversible title card which came with the original Star Wars: Clone Wars pack. On one side was Jedi and the other side was Sith.
- Glow-in-the-dark cases which came with: The Simpsons Horror, Horror and Star Wars: Clone Wars.
- Glow-in-the-dark writing and images on the actual cards, in the Ben 10, Horror, Star Wars: Clone Wars and The Simpsons Horror packs.
- In many packs the backs of the cards can be put together as a puzzle. Some examples of this are in the Skyscrapers, Space, Wonders of the World, and many sports packs. These can form pictures of football stadiums, landmarks, maps, sports teams and a scale between different objects (such as skyscrapers, and planets, in the Space pack).
- Some of the card backs give extra information about subjects in the pack. For example, the All Blacks pack has information about the history of the team and the Haka, while the Skyscrapers pack gives information about French 'Spiderman' Alain Robert.
- In The X Factor pack, there are eight cards (Alexandra Burke, Austin Drage, Daniel Evans, Diana Vickers, Eoghan Quigg, JLS, Laura White, Rachel Hylton, Ruth Lorenzo and Scott Bruton) that have white discs in their X Factor score category that allow you to fill in what you think their score should be.
- The Prince of Persia pack came with two bonus cards for the Top Trumps Tournament. Alice in Wonderland and Prince of Persia.
- The Cretin pack came with Regret. When accompanied by Steve Drew, also Jägermeister.

=== Top Trumps 3D ===
At a toy fair, Winning Moves UK revealed that it had started to make a Top Trumps 3D version with cards whose pictures became 3D. A number of titles have been scheduled for such a release. To work, the appropriate software must be downloaded and the cards must be displayed before a Webcam. This projects a 3D image of the image on the card, which displays once questions are answered. A number of packs were released in this format, the first of which was Bugs released in May 2009.

The 3D image has other features in addition to the user being able to make it making it move. For example, the 3D tarantula from the Bugs collection can also be made to dance, slide on ice, and hunt among other things. In the Transformers: Revenge of the Fallen collection, Optimus Prime can be driven in truck mode and transformed into robot mode. From the SpongeBob SquarePants collection, SpongeBob can be made to flip patties.

There are various Top Trumps Showcase cards released as part of the Hamleys 3D announcement event that can display images. These include the spider (non-moveable), Optimus prime (robot mode only, non-moveable) and Wrestling arena with a fist coming through it (WWE). These can be used with content downloaded from the Hamleys Showcase main site.

Winning Moves has been often criticised for releasing the pack but not releasing the 3D content until several weeks later. This has led to outrage from buyers of the pack as they expect the 3D content to be available at the same time as the pack.

Another common feature for the 3D cards is to feature video clips. For example, the Marvel Ultimate Villains pack, released with the Daily Mirror and the Daily Record, has previews of Iron Man 2.

Winning Moves originally required a different programme to be downloaded for each 3D pack. However, in 2010, they introduced a 3D hub which updates when they updated it with new packs.

=== Activity packs ===
Activity packs are another version of Top Trumps that have now replaced the old Juniors range. They have 24 cards, two of each, with one with stats and one with information. There are differences between the two pictures to play spot-the-difference with. There are also word searches, mazes and other activities based on the pack. They come in a tuck box instead of the plastic cases. They are based on things that young children would like to play with as young children are the primary market for these products.

=== Top Trumps tournament ===
Top Trumps Tournament is a new spin on Top Trumps, and was released in October 2009. It included 6 new Classics packs, along with a spinner. Players would place six card packs around the spinner and spin to determine the pack they would use. The packs included are: Movies, TV, Pop Stars, Top Toys, Sporting Heroes, and WOW (Wonders of the World). In this release, the card packs came in plastic cases, instead of tuck boxes as before.

There is also a Star Wars version of this featuring all of the Star Wars packs created by Winning Moves up until the point of release. This is available at HMV only until January 2010. It has, however, appeared on play.com as well, whether Winning moves allowed this or not is unknown. The Star Wars Tournament also comes with a new Star Wars pack, Star Wars: 30 Greatest Moments with a card for each greatest moment in the films.

A FIFA World Cup tournament was also released in May 2010 and a Marvel tournament is also scheduled for release in 2011, featuring 6 exclusive packs each.

There are also exclusive cards given out in special circumstances for the original tournament games. A list can be seen here.

=== iPhone Top Trumps ===
Mid 2009, it was announced that Winning Moves UK have been in discussions with parties to try and create a version of Top Trumps for the iPhone. A Ben 10 version was released February 2010, available for download off the App Store.

=== Mini Top Trumps ===
Mini Top Trumps were packs of football cards sold at newsagents. They contained 18 playable cards for the packs and 2 extra bonus cards for the Top Trumps Tournaments. There were 8 different cards in these packs.

Six new football Mini Top Trumps packs are to be released, available in the Top Trumps online shop and an X Factor pack were also released. These contain Predict and Win cards instead of the bonus Tournament cards that the original Mini pack had. These allowed the winner to either see a football team of their choice or, in the case of the X Factor pack, see the X Factor Live show. The X Factor finalists pack has also been released.

There is also a Super Mini Top Trumps of Disney Pixar, Cars, SpongeBob SquarePants, Star Wars and Baby Animals. These are exclusive to Poundland. The cards are similar to the main decks but there are only 20 cards, 14 of which are playable, 1 instruction card, 4 advert/trivia cards and a title card. The cards also have one less stat than the main pack.

=== Shop-exclusive packs ===
There are some packs that are only exclusive to one shop. These are:

- Cars is only available in the Disney Store. This is a full deck compared to the other Activity Pack by Winning Moves.
- Ultimate Supercars only available to H.R. Owen customers
- Michael Jackson is only available at HMV.
- Top Trumps Tournament Star Wars edition was only available at HMV until 1 January 2010.
- British Wildlife is only available at National Trust shops or on the online National Trust shop.
- 30 Great Days Out is only available at National Trust shops or on the online National Trust shop.
- Everton F.C. 2011–2012 – Only available from the Everton F.C. shop or online store.
- West Ham United 2011–2012 – Only available from the West Ham United store or online megastore.
- West Ham United Legends (Series 2) 2013 – only available from the West Ham United store or online megastore.
- Merlin Entertainments Thrill Rides (2011–2013), Alton Towers, Thorpe Park Top 30 Attractions and Chessington World of Adventures (2018)- Only available from the gift shops of the individual theme parks.

=== Royal Wedding 2011 ===
For the 2011 Royal Wedding, Winning Moves UK produced a new pack of Top Trumps based on the Royal Family and guests coming to the wedding. This pack was classed as a "Very Specials" pack, the only one of its kind. This also led to a few promotions including giving a couple getting married a chance to get into their own wedding pack and a special WOW card was made to be played with the Top Trumps Tournament was in the packs of Top Trumps. They were also giving out giant Top Trumps cards to people who were camping out to see the wedding and giving out free packs of Royal Wedding Top Trumps to those caught on TV showing the giant cards. A special commemorative card was also handed out at the wedding itself.

== Non-Winning Moves UK packs ==
Several unofficial copies of the game have been made, both as commercial card games and online gaming sites. The BBC web site has Top Trumps variants with themes of snooker, Buffy, Doctor Who and EastEnders. Citadel Combat Cards were a similar card game from the early 1990s with photographs of various Games Workshop models. Originally based on Warhammer Fantasy Battle models, later included Warhammer 40,000 cards as well. A Top Trumps-style card game called "Outrage" was also included in The Mighty Boosh Future Sailors Tour Deluxe DVD set.

There are also at least four educational variations of the game: Cell Trumps from Centre of the Cell, Scotland's Suffragette Trumps (from Protests and Suffragettes, featuring 44 suffrage activists who campaigned across Scotland),Tree Trumps from the Forestry Commission (as an interactive exhibit in the Glenmore Visitor Centre and as a card game available in some Forestry Commission Scotland giftshops) and Timber Trumps from Napier University. Timber Trumps was, for the first few days, originally called Tree Trumps and was listed under this name on Channel 4's Games website.

Other variations include card games that include data about specific topics. Safari Pals packs include animal data on each card so that trump style games can be played in addition to other traditional game variations including Rummy, Quartets and Go Fish. The Royal Society of Chemistry has produced a pack of Visual Elements Trumps, using element data for play. Outset Media released a themed version for animal poop called "Dung Deck" where players can battle statistics for frequency, hardness, length, width, smelliness, and yuck factor of an animal's 'business'.

There have been lots of other packs before Winning Moves UK took over. These have been made by Waddingtons, Dubreq, Ace and many other companies up until 1999. These packs are usually rarer than the newer Winning Moves packs as they are much older.

Companies sometimes create their own decks of cards based on their areas of expertise using the same style as Top Trumps. This is often used as promotional material or free gifts.

In 2019 a special one-off #wnf special was produced to commemorate the founders 50th Birthday.

== See also ==
- Ace Trumps
- Quartets (card game)
