= Mystery Rummy: Murders in the Rue Morgue =

1999 card game

Mystery Rummy: Murders in the Rue Morgue is a 1999 card game published by U.S. Games Systems.

== Gameplay ==
Mystery Rummy: Murders in the Rue Morgue is a game in which players investigate a murder using meld‑and‑gavel mechanics while adding a secret kitty that rewards the first player to go out, with an optional 4‑player partnership mode.

== Reviews ==
- Rue Morgue #10
- Family Games: The 100 Best
