= Go Fish =

Card game

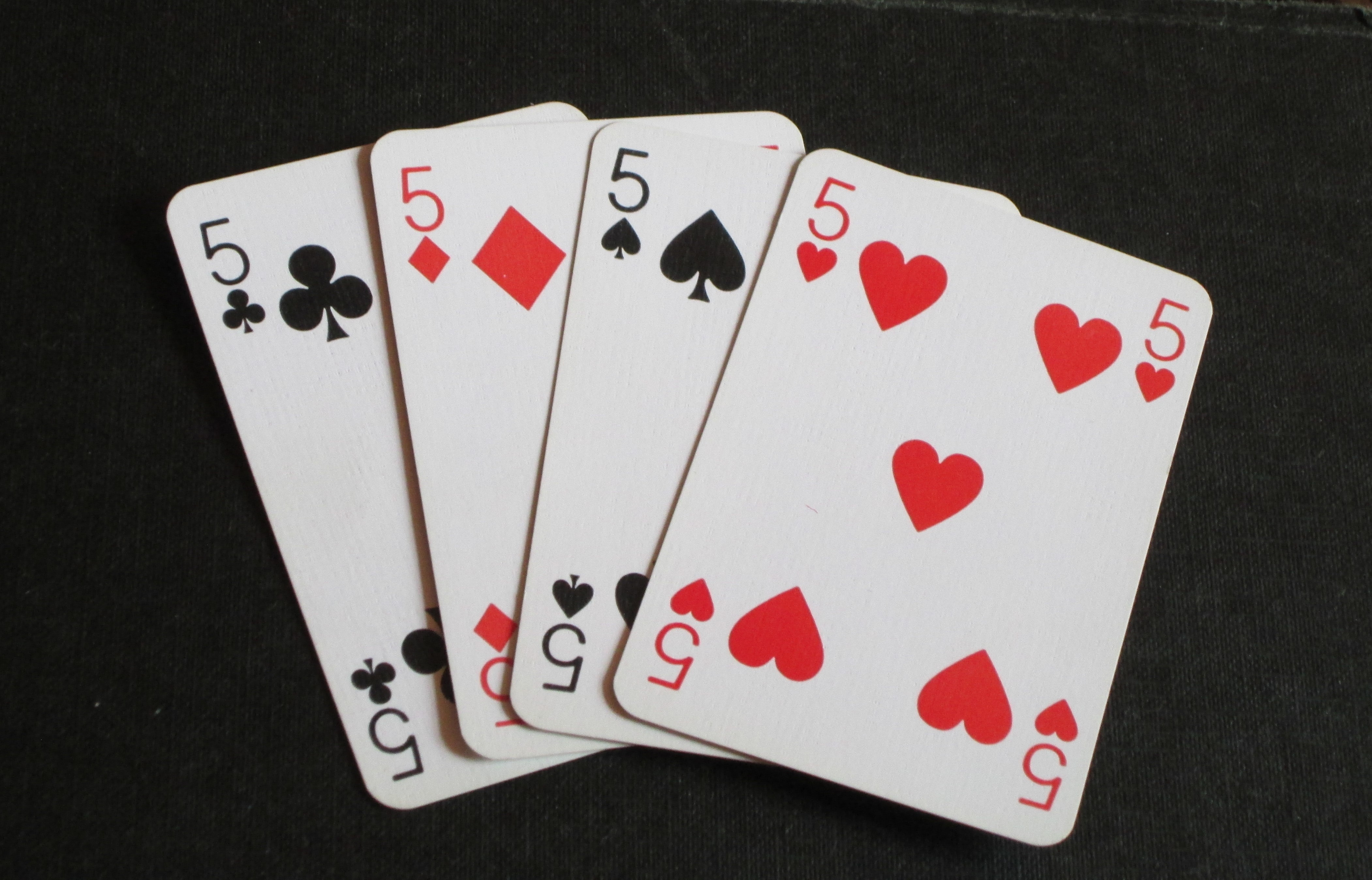
- Four cards of the same rank are known as a "book", and the aim of the game is to collect these.
- Alternative name: Fish
- Type: Matching
- Players: 2–5+
- Skills: Matching and pairing, memory
- Age range: All ages
- Cards: 52 (54 counting Jokers)
- Deck: French
- Play: Variable sequence
- Playing time: 5-15 minutes
- Chance: Low-Medium skill

Related games
- Happy Families

Go Fish or Fish is a card game for approximately two to five players, often played by children.

== History ==
The game was played at least as early as 1933, the date of a psychological study which describes a profoundly intellectually disabled teenage boy who enjoyed imitating the playing of "a card game called 'Go fish'", although he understood no more of the rules than that "the drawing of a card from the pack before him should follow the remark, 'Go-fish.'" A 1940 syllabus of grade school French, proposing a similar game as a language-learning exercise, also refers to the game of "Go Fish," describing its rules as the same as those of Authors. A game current in Italy at the end of the 15th century which had a similar name, Andare e piscere, might have also had similar rules, but no contemporary description of this game survives.

== Rules ==
The game can be played by two players or more, up to about five or six. Five cards are dealt from a standard 52-card deck to each player, or seven cards if there are only two or three players. The remaining cards are placed face down, usually spread out in a pile.

During a turn a player asks any other player for their cards of a particular rank, for example, Joey asks, "Amelia, do you have any eights?" Joey must hold at least one card of the rank he requested and Amelia must hand over all cards of that rank if she has any. If she has none, Amelia tells Joey to "go fish" (or simply "fish"), and he would draw a card from the stock and place it in his hand. Then it is the next player's turn—except that some variations allow Joey's turn to continue if the card that he draws is the rank he last named, or if it completes a book. When any player at any time has four cards of a particular rank, they form a book, and the cards must be placed face up in front of that player. Play passes to the left, or to the player who was unsuccessfully asked for cards.

The winner is the first player to run out of cards in their hand by laying them down in books of four cards. Some rules allow that if two players go out at the same time—for instance, if Amelia makes a book with the last cards in her hand by taking the last cards from Joey's hand—Joey may end up winning if he has collected more books. Other rules specify that the winner is whoever has the most books when the first player runs out of cards. Alternatively, play may continue until all thirteen books have been made, with players who run out of cards drawing from the stock before taking their turn; the winner is then the player with the most books at the end.

=== Variations ===
There are a number of variations of these basic rules:

- A player gives only one card when asked.
- A player forms and lays down pairs instead of 4-card books.
- A player asks for a specific card instead of a rank. A player must still have at least one card of the named rank in order to ask, and must reveal that card when asking. This is similar to Happy Families.
- If the other players got all their matches and one player has a card left while there are no more go-fish cards to draw, the player with the remaining card loses the game.
- Books are saved by each player, face down. When the main play is finished, a further stage of play starts, with the player who has the most books. That player may ask another player for a rank that they remember that player has; if correct they win the pair; if incorrect, play passes to the next player. The winner is the player who has eventually collected a pair of every rank.
- Jokers can be used to create a pair by asking another player if they have any jokers in their hand. Two jokers form one pair.
- Jokers can be used as wild cards.

== Strategy ==
If, when fishing, a player draws a rank they did not have, they should ask for it on their next turn. Otherwise, they should rotate among the ranks that they already hold. In the more difficult variants, strategy often requires memorizing which cards each player possesses as a player asking for a card is a tell that they have one or multiple versions of said card rank. Unlike many card games, Go Fish depends on the honor system; lying about the contents of one's hand is difficult to prevent.

It is often beneficial for the player to conceal the cards they hold in order to prevent other players from knowing which cards they can ask for. This can be accomplished by consistently asking different players for the same rank of card.

== Special card decks ==
Instead of using a standard 52 playing card deck, various specialty decks have been manufactured including the 169 count playing card Kids Classic Go Fish Card Game by U.S. Games Systems. Other specialist card packs which can be used to play similar games have also been produced including the Safari Pals packs which use animal characteristics to form the sets and packs which use personalized names to form the sets.

Go Fish also paved the way for a similar, particular kind of card game called Quartets.

== See also ==
- Literature (card game)
- Happy Families – Card game from the UK with almost identical rules.
