= Ace Trumps =

Card game published by German company Altenburg-Stralsunder

Ace Trumps is an early version of the popular card game Top Trumps, released from 1976 to 1984, by German company Altenburg-Stralsunder. Before releasing Ace Trumps, Ace also released many Quartet games. These packs had 32 cards in each as opposed to Winning Moves' Top Trumps which usually had 30 cards.

There was also Special Trump Cards versions of Ace Trumps. These were a yellow and red card. If the yellow card was the next card for a player, everyone must give the owner of that card their next card. If they get the red card, everyone has to give them the top card from their pile.

== Gameplay ==
Each pack of Ace Trumps is based on a theme, such as cars, aircraft, animals or boats. Unlike the modern Top Trumps, Ace Trumps didn't release any packs requiring a license, such as TV and Film shows. One exception though is a pack of Muppet Show Quartets.

Each card in the pack shows a list of numerical data about the item. For example, in a pack based on cars, each card shows a different model of car, and the stats and data may include its engine size, its weight, its length, and its top speed.

All the cards are dealt among the players. There must be at least two players, and at least one card for each player. The starting player (normally the player sitting on the dealer's left) selects a category from his or her topmost card and reads out its value. Each other player then reads out the value of the same category from their cards. The best (usually the largest) value wins the "trick", and the winner takes all the cards of the trick and places them at the bottom of his or her pile. That player then looks at their new topmost card, and chooses the category for the next round. Ace introduced the Super Trump, a card that beats all other cards except "A" cards regardless of its data.

In the event of a draw, the cards are placed in the centre and a new category is chosen from the next card by the same person as in the previous round. The winner of that round obtains all of the cards in the centre as well as the top card from each player.

The game ends when one player has won all of the card off the other players.

== Variations ==
Many different variations of Ace have been released. These include:

- Ace Quartet
- Rummy
- Top Ace
- Ace Maxi Mini Quartets
- Ace Fact Pack
- NFL Fact Pack
- Ace Trump Game
- Power Trumps
- Ace Maxi Mini Trumps
- Ace Trumps
- Ace Sporting Aces
- Ace Supertrump

== Promotions ==
Ace held some competitions, where cards were collected and then redeemed. They were:

- In 1976 a competition to win a flight on Concorde (offer expired 31 January 1977) and/or an offer to receive a 60 X 80 cm colour poster of Concorde in exchange for 4 Credit Cards (10 points each, one per pack) and 18p to cover post and packing.
- In 1977 a competition to see the 1977 Italian Grand Prix live in Monza (offer expired 1 August 1977) by answering 5 multiple choice questions and then design a space age Formula One race car on a sheet of paper no bigger than 25 X 20 cm and/or an offer to receive one of 3 80 X 60 cm posters (Great Formula One Cars, Great Formula One Drivers, Great Formula One Races) in exchange for 4 Credit Cards (10 points each, one per pack) and 18p to cover post and packing.
- In 1978 an offer to receive 1 of 8 60 X 80 cm posters (Concorde, Great Formula One Cars, Great Formula One Drivers, Great Formula One Races, Famous Tanks, Famous Warships of World War II, Famous Planes of World War II and Famous British Steam Locomotives).

== See also ==
- Safari Pals
- Quartets (card game)
