= Authors (card game) =

Commercial card game

The Game of Authors
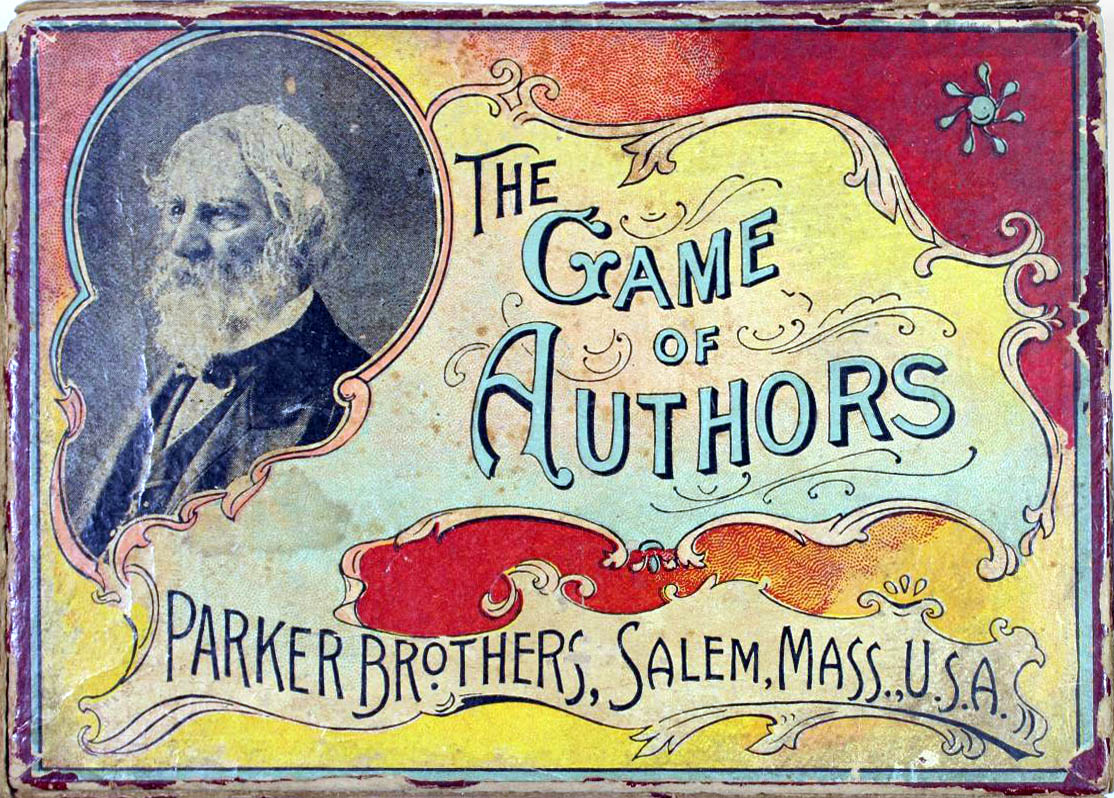
- Cover of a 1890 edition
- Other names: Authors
- Designers: Anne W. Abbott
- Publishers: G. M. Whipple & A. A. Smith; Parker Brothers
- Publication: 1861; 165 years ago
- Genres: Educational
- Players: 2–6
- Playing time: 5'–15'
- Age range: 7+

Related games
- Go Fish; Quartets

Authors or, The Game of Authors is an educational game for three to five players. First published by G. M. Whipple & A. A. Smith of Salem, Massachusetts in 1861, The Game of Authors was in 1897 published by Parker Brothers, also located in Salem, Massachusetts at that time.

The Game of Authors is one of the earliest versions of the family of Go Fish games, in which players call on each other to give up a named card. The play is based on a specialized deck of playing cards.

Later decks included additional authors, but the authors represented in most decks are:

- Mark Twain
- Charles Dickens
- William Makepeace Thackeray
- Robert Louis Stevenson
- William Shakespeare
- James Fenimore Cooper
- Washington Irving
- Nathaniel Hawthorne
- Henry Wadsworth Longfellow
- Sir Walter Scott
- Alfred, Lord Tennyson
- Louisa May Alcott
- Edgar Allan Poe
