= Happy families =

Card game

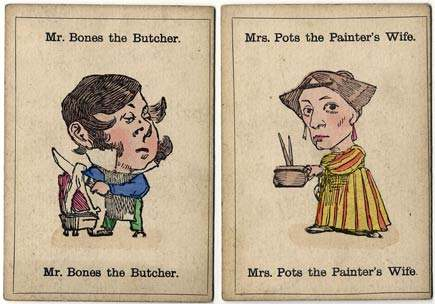
- Two cards from an 1880s edition of Jaques' Happy Families
- Alternative names: Quartett, Ablegspiel
- Type: Matching
- Players: 3–4 (2–8)
- Age range: 3+
- Cards: various
- Deck: Dedicated
- Play: Clockwise
- Easy to play

Happy families is a traditional British card game usually with a specially made set of picture cards, featuring illustrations of fictional families of four, most often based on occupation types. The object of the game, which is similar to Go Fish and Quartets, is to collect complete families.

In Germany and Austria, the game is known as Quartett or Ablegspiel (in Upper Austria and Styria) and is not restricted to sets of four people, but covers other topics such as farm animals or tractors. The game can also be adapted for use with an ordinary set of playing cards.

== Gameplay ==
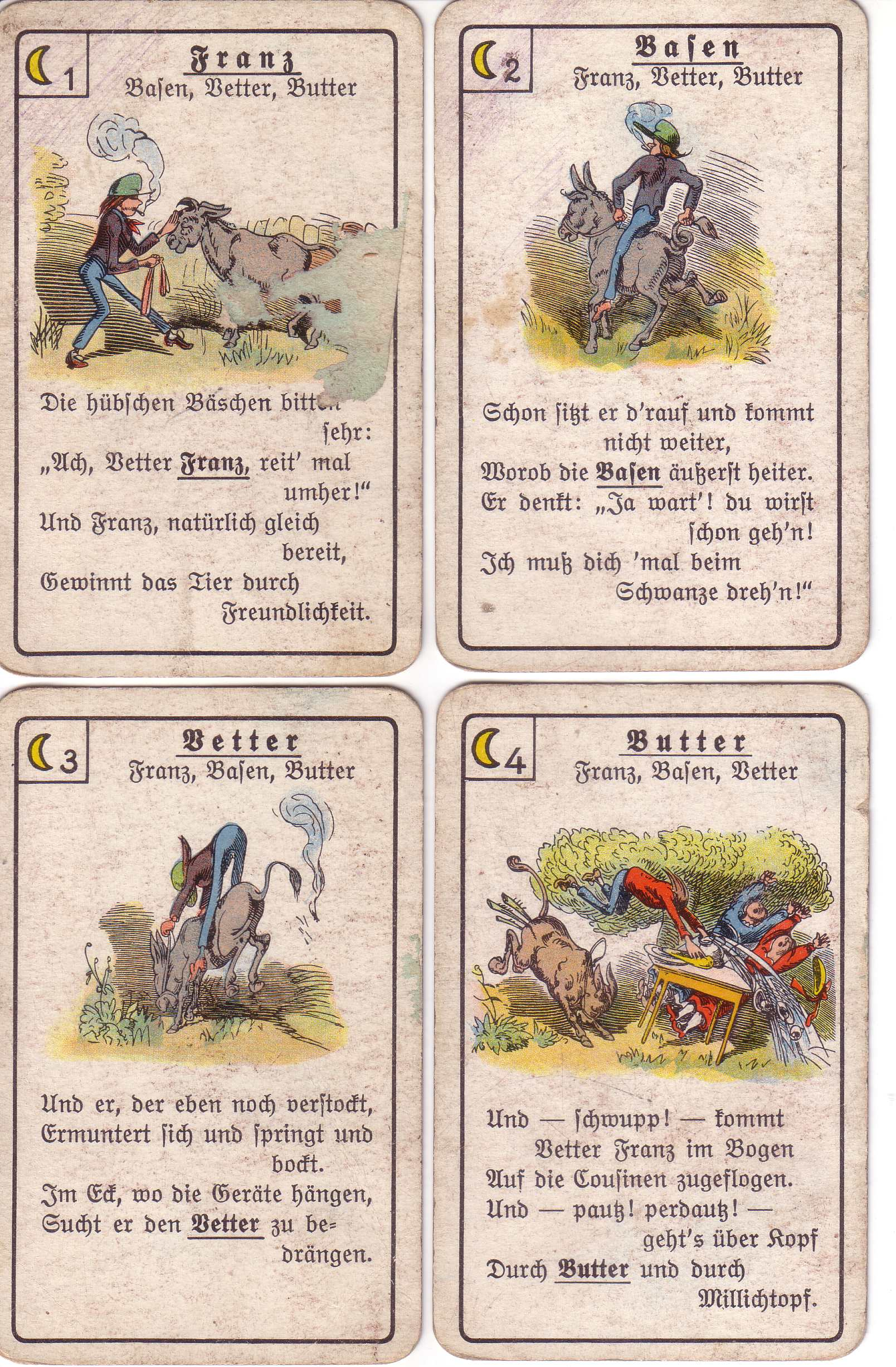
A 'family' from a set of old German Quartett cards. Each card lists the three others that it groups with.

The player whose turn it is asks another player for a specific card: the asking player must hold a card of the same family. If the asked player has the card, they must give it to the requester, and the requester then takes another turn. If the asked player does not have the card, they say "not at home" and it becomes the asked player's turn.

When a player completes a family they place it face-down in front of them. Play continues in this way until no families are separated among different players. The player with the most completed families wins.

== Development ==
The game was devised by John Jaques Jr. who is also credited with popularizing tiddlywinks, ludo and snakes and ladders, and first published before the Great Exhibition of 1851. Cards following Jaques' original designs, with grotesque illustrations possibly by Sir John Tenniel (there was no official credit), are still being made.

== Family members ==
The names of the family members are structured as follows, where X stands for a surname and Y for an occupation.

- Mr X the Y
- Mrs X the Y's wife
- Master X the Y's son
- Miss X the Y's daughter

The eleven families in Jaques' original edition were:

- Block, the barber
- Bones, the butcher
- Bun, the baker
- Bung, the brewer
- Chip, the carpenter
- Dip, the dyer
- Dose, the doctor
- Grits, the grocer
- Pots, the painter
- Soot, the sweep
- Tape, the tailor

== See also ==
- Old maid (card game)
