= The Pictorial Key to the Tarot =

1910 book by A. E. Waite

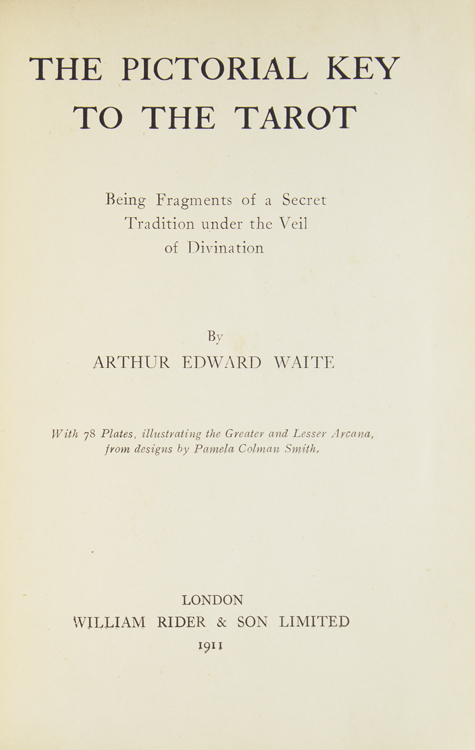
- Title page of the first edition, dated 1911
- Author: Arthur Edward Waite
- Illustrator: Pamela Colman Smith
- Language: English
- Subject: Divinatory tarot
- Published: 1910/1911
- Publisher: William Rider & Son
- Publication place: United Kingdom
- Text: The Pictorial Key to the Tarot at Wikisource

The Pictorial Key to the Tarot is a divinatory tarot guide, with text by A. E. Waite and illustrations by Pamela Colman Smith. Published in conjunction with the Rider–Waite–Smith tarot deck, the pictorial version (released 1910, dated 1911) followed the success of the deck and Waite's (unillustrated 1909) text The Key to the Tarot. Both Waite and Smith were members of the Hermetic Order of the Golden Dawn. Waite was very concerned with the accuracy of the symbols used for the deck, and he did much research into the traditions, interpretations, and history behind the cards.

The book (which Waite himself called "a monograph") consists of three parts.

1. Part I, "The Veil and Its Symbols", is a short overview of the traditional symbols associated with each card, followed by a history of the Tarot. Waite dismissed as baseless the belief that the Tarot was Egyptian in origin, and noted that no evidence of the cards exists prior to the 15th century.
2. Part II, "The Doctrine of the Veil", contains 78 black and white plates of Smith's illustrations for the Rider–Waite–Smith deck, and a discussion of the unique symbols chosen for each card. Waite drew upon the earlier Tarot of French occultist Eliphas Levi, at times retaining his changes to the traditional deck (as with the Chariot card, which both Waite and Levi picture being drawn by two sphinx, instead of horses), at other times criticizing him (as with the Hermit card, which Waite thought Levi misinterpreted).
3. Part III, "The Outer Methods of the Oracles", concerns matters of divination with the cards, including a description of the famous Celtic Cross Tarot layout, which the book helped popularize.

In 1916, American author L. W. de Laurence published an exact facsimile copy of the book under the title The Illustrated Key to the Tarot: The Veil of Divination, Illustrating the Greater and Lesser Arcana without giving any credit to Waite or Smith.
