= Quartets (card game) =

Austrian card game

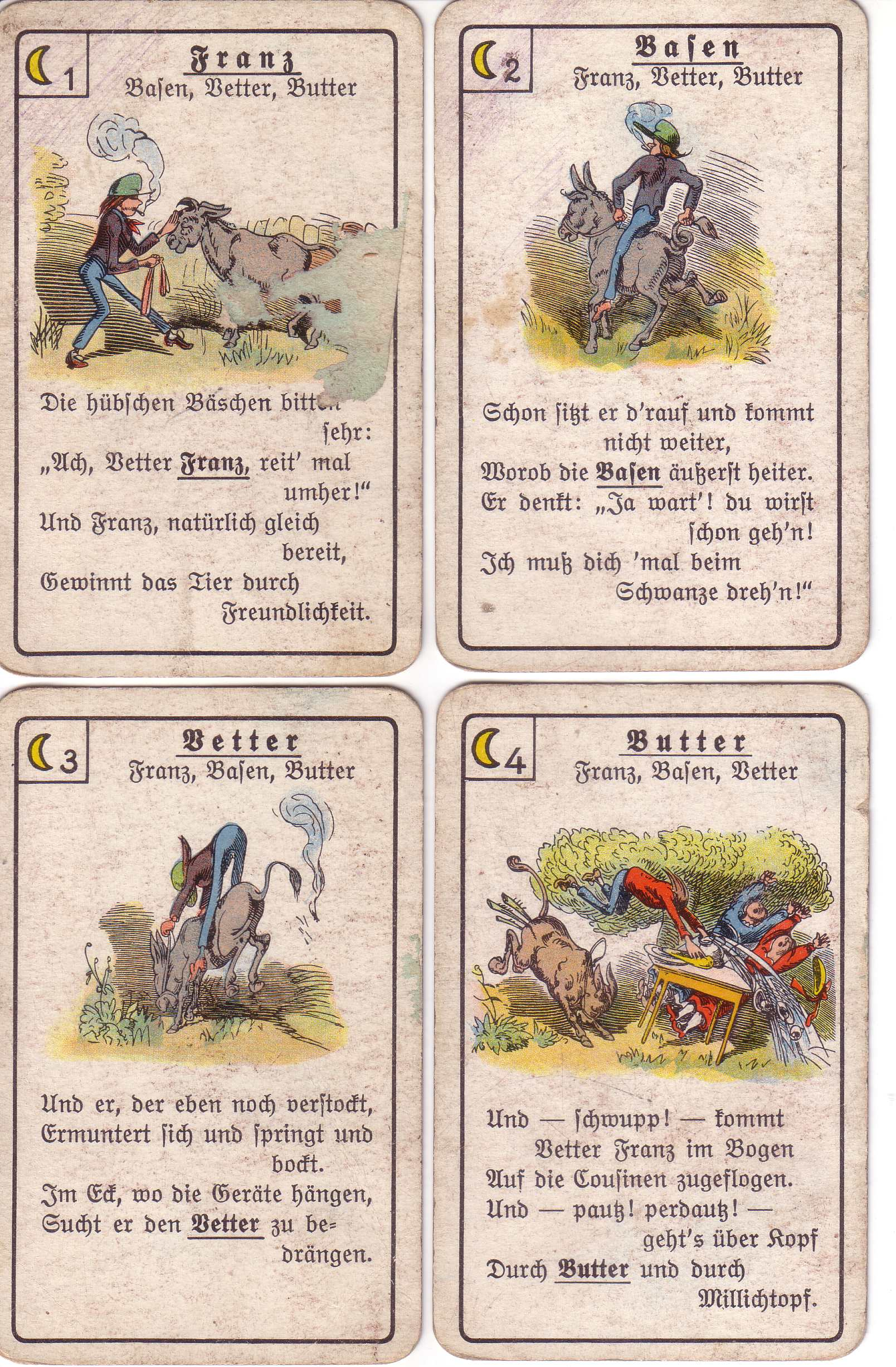
Four cards of a group, from a German Quartets deck by Wilhelm Busch (1832–1908): "Franz", "Basen", "Vetter" and "Butter". Each card names the other three in its group.

Quartets is a dedicated deck card game with the object to collect 4 cards in a series, similar to Go Fish and Happy Families.

Each pack originally contained 32 cards, divided into 8 groups of 4 cards, unlike a normal 52 pack of playing cards, but the number of groups changed from company to company.

A version of the game was published by the Austrian card game company Piatnik during the 1960s, and later released by Dubreq, Ace, Waddingtons and other companies. The game went on to inspire Top Trumps.

== Gameplay ==
Quartets is played with three or more players, with the aim to win quartets (sets of four). Each card usually has a number and letter (1A, 1B, 1C, 1D, 2A, 2B etc. ) in the top right or left corner of the card.

The cards are shuffled and an equal number are dealt to all the players, who hold them without revealing their hand to other players. The player to the dealer's left starts by asking another player if they had a certain card (example, card 4C) which would help the player create a quartet. If the player does have the card, then they hand it over. If the player does not have the card, then it becomes their turn to ask.

When a quartet is created, or a complete quartet was dealt, then the cards creating the quartet are placed in front of the player. The game ends when all the quartets have been created. The winner is the person with the most quartets.
