= A. E. Waite =

British poet and mystic (1857–1942)

Arthur Edward Waite
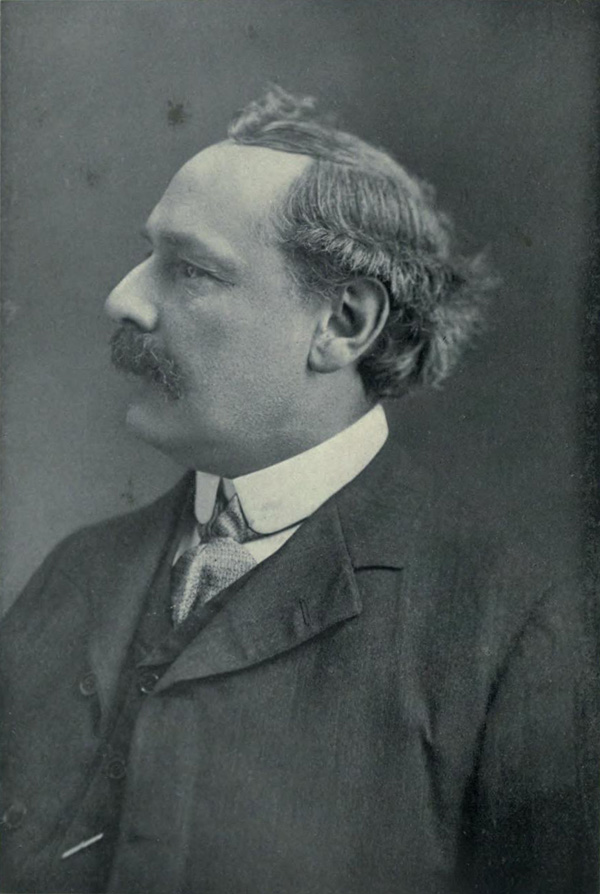
- Waite in 1911
- Born: 2 October 1857; Brooklyn, New York, United States
- Died: 19 May 1942 (aged 84); London, England
- Resting place: Bishopsbourne Village, in the county of Kent, England
- Known for: Rider–Waite Tarot
- Spouses: Ada Lakeman (m. 1888; died 1924) Mary Broadbent Schofield (m. 1933)
- Children: 1 daughter

Arthur Edward Waite (2 October 1857 – 19 May 1942) was a British poet and scholarly mystic who wrote extensively on the occult and Western esotericism. He was the co-creator of the Rider–Waite Tarot (also called the Rider–Waite–Smith or Waite–Smith deck). As his biographer R. A. Gilbert described him, "Waite's name has survived because he was the first to attempt a systematic study of the history of Western occultism—viewed as a spiritual tradition rather than as aspects of protoscience or as the pathology of religion."

He was a Freemason, as well as being a member of the Societas Rosicruciana in Anglia and the Hermetic Order of the Golden Dawn.

He spent most of his life in or near London, connected to various publishing houses and editing a magazine, The Unknown World.

== Early life and education ==
Arthur Edward Waite was born on 2 October 1857 in Brooklyn, New York City, United States, to unmarried parents. His father, Captain Charles F. Waite, died at sea when Arthur was very young, and his widowed mother, Emma Lovell, returned to her home country of England, where he was then raised. They were well enough off to educate Waite at a small private school in North London.

When he was 13, he was educated for two terms at St. Charles' College. When he left school to become a clerk he wrote verse in his spare time. In 1863 Waite's mother converted to Catholicism and Arthur was raised a Catholic. The death of his sister Frederika Waite in 1874 soon attracted him into psychical research. At 21, he began to read regularly in the Library of the British Museum, studying many branches of esotericism. In 1881 Waite discovered the writings of Éliphas Lévi.

== Career ==
=== Golden Dawn ===
Waite joined the Outer Order of the Hermetic Order of the Golden Dawn in January 1891 after being introduced by Edmund William Berridge. In 1893 he withdrew from the Golden Dawn, but rejoined the Outer Order in 1896. In 1899 he entered the Second order of the Golden Dawn. He became a Freemason in 1901, and entered the Societas Rosicruciana in Anglia (SRIA) in 1902.

In 1903 Waite founded the Independent and Rectified Order R. R. et A. C. This Order was disbanded in 1914. The Golden Dawn was torn by internal feuding until Waite's departure in 1914; in July 1915 he formed the Fellowship of the Rosy Cross. By that time there existed some half-dozen offshoots from the original Golden Dawn, and as a whole it never recovered.

=== Freemason ===
Waite was interested in the higher grades of Freemasonry and saw initiation into Craft Masonry as a way to gain access to these rites. After joining the SRIA and the Knights Templar, Waite travelled to Switzerland in 1903 to receive the Régime Ecossais Rectifié or the Rectified Scottish Rite and its grade of Chevalier Bienfaisant de la Cité Sainte (C.B.C.S.). Waite believed that the Rectified Scottish Rite, more than any other Masonic Rite, represented the "Secret Tradition" of mystical spiritual illumination.

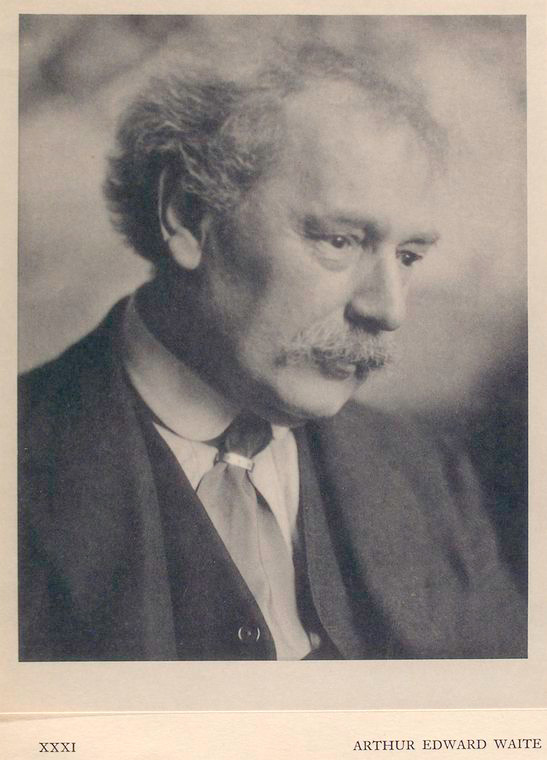
Waite photographed in London, 13 January 1921

=== Writer and scholar ===
Waite was a writer and many of his works were well received in the esoteric circles of his time, but his lack of academic training is visible in his limitations as a historian and in his belittling of other authors.

He wrote texts on subjects including divination, esotericism, freemasonry, ceremonial magic, Kabbalism and alchemy; he also translated and reissued several mystical works. He wrote about the Holy Grail, influenced by his friendship with Arthur Machen. A number of his volumes remain in print, including The Book of Ceremonial Magic (1911), The Holy Kabbalah (1929), A New Encyclopedia of Freemasonry (1921), and his edited translation of Lévi's 1896 Transcendental Magic, its Doctrine and Ritual (1910), having been reprinted in recent years.

Waite also wrote two allegorical fantasy novels, Prince Starbeam (1889) and The Quest of the Golden Stairs (1893), and edited Elfin Music, an anthology of poetry based on English fairy folklore.

== Tarot deck ==
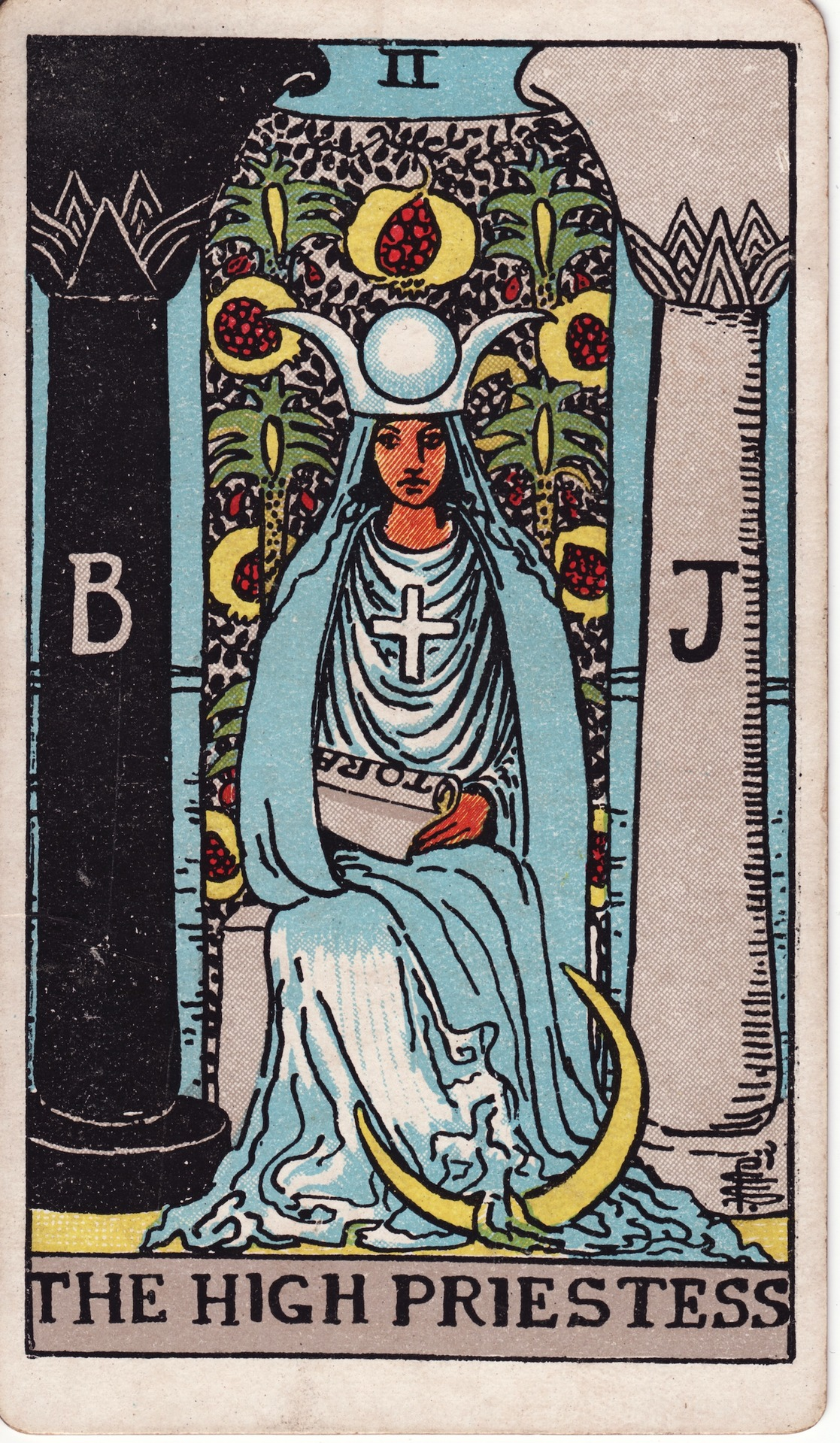
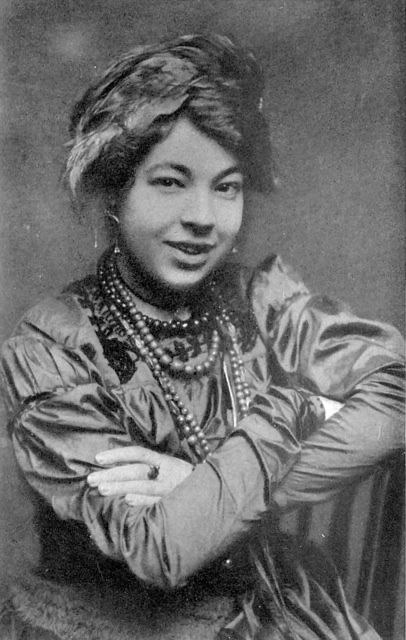
The High Priestess, left, and the illustrator Pamela Colman Smith, from the now-famous tarot deck.

Waite is best known for his involvement with the Rider–Waite Tarot, first published in 1909, with illustrations by his fellow Golden Dawn member Pamela Colman Smith. Waite authored the deck's companion volume, the Key to the Tarot, republished in expanded form in 1911 as the Pictorial Key to the Tarot, a guide to tarot-reading. The Rider–Waite Tarot was notable for illustrating all 78 cards fully, at a time when only the 22 Major Arcana cards were typically illustrated, with the Sola Busca tarot, 1491, being a notable historical exception. Prior to the publication of this deck, many esoteric tarot readers used the Tarot of Marseilles playing card deck. The Rider-Waite deck has gone on to have a large influence on contemporary tarot card reading.

== Personal life ==
In 1888 he married Ada Lakeman (also called "Lucasta"), and they had one daughter, Sybil. From 1900 to 1909 Waite earned a living as a manager for Horlicks, the manufacturer of malted milk.

Lucasta died in 1924. In 1933 Waite married Mary Broadbent Schofield. Waite died on 19 May 1942 at age 84.

== In popular culture ==
H. P. Lovecraft's short story "The Thing on the Doorstep" includes a character named Ephraim Waite. According to Robert M. Price, this character was based on Waite.

== Works ==
- Waite, A. E. (1886a). Israfel: Letters, Visions and Poems. London: Allen.
- Waite, A. E. (1886b). The Mysteries of Magic: A Digest of the Writings of Eliphas Levi. London: George Redway.
- Waite, A. E. (1887). The Real History of the Rosicrucians. London.
- Waite, A. E. (1888a). Alchemists Through the Ages.
- Waite, A. E. (1888b). Lives of Alchemystical Philosophers. London: George Redway.
- Waite, A. E. (1888c). Songs and Poems of Fairyland: An Anthology of English Fairy Poetry. London.
- Waite, A. E. (1891). The Occult Sciences: A Compendium of Transcendental Doctrine and Experiment. London: Kegan Paul, Trench, Trubner & Co., Ltd.
- Waite, A. E. (1893). The Alchemical Writings of Edward Kelly. London.
- Waite, A. E. (1896). Devil-Worship in France. London: George Redway.
- Waite, A. E. (1898). The Book of Black Magic and of Pacts.
- Waite, A. E. (1902). A Book of Mystery and Vision.
- Waite, A. E. (1909). The Hidden Church of the Holy Graal: its legends and symbolism considered in their affinity with certain mysteries of initiation and other traces of a secret tradition in Christian times.
- Waite, A. E. (1910). Steps to the Crown.
- Waite, A. E. (1911a). The Pictorial Key to the Tarot. London: William Ryder & Son, Ltd.
- Waite, A. E. (1911b). The Secret Tradition in Freemasonry. London: Rebman. Two volumes.
- Waite, A. E. (1912). The Book of Destiny and The Art of Reading Therein. London: William Rider & Son Ltd.
- Waite, A. E. (1913). The Book of Ceremonial Magic. London.
- Waite, A. E. (1913). The Secret Doctrine in Israel A Study of the Zohar and Its Connections. London: William Rider & Son Limited.
- Waite, A. E. (1914). The collected poems of Arthur Edward Waite, in two volumes. London: William Rider & Son Ltd.
- Waite, A. E. (1916). The Unknown Philosopher The Life of Louis Claude de Saint-Martin and the Substance of His Transcendental Doctrine. London.
- Waite, A. E. (1921). A New Encyclopedia of Freemasonry.
- Waite, A. E. (1922). Saint-Martin: The French Mystic and the Story of Modern Martinism.
- Waite, A. E. (1924). The Brotherhood of the Rosy Cross: Being Records of the House of the Holy Spirit in its Inward and Outward History. London: William Rider & Son Ltd.
- Waite, A. E. (1925). Emblematic Freemasonry and the Evolution of its Deeper Issues. London: William Rider & Son Limited.
- Waite, A. E. (1926). The Secret Tradition in Alchemy: Its Development and Records. New York: Alfred A. Knopf.
- Waite, A. E. (1929). The Holy Kabbalah.
- Waite, A. E. (1933). The Holy Grail, Its Legends and Symbolism. Rider & Co, Ltd.
- Waite, A. E. (1938). Shadows of Life and Thought: A Retrospective Review in the Form of Memoirs. London: Selwyn and Blount.

=== Translations ===
- Jennis, Lucas (1893) [1625]. Musaeum Hermeticum [The Hermetic Museum]. Translated by A. E. Waite. London. Two volumes.
- Anonymous (1894) [c. 900]. Turba Philosophorum [Assembly of the Philosophers]. Translated by A. E. Waite.
- Petrus Bonus (1894) [c. 1330-1339]. Margarita Preciosa Novella [New Pearl of Great Price]. Translated by A. E. Waite. James Elliott and Co.
- Papus (1958). The Tarot of the Bohemians. Translated by A. E. Waite.
- Éliphas Lévi, The history of magic (1922)
