= The High Priestess =

Tarot card of the Major Arcana

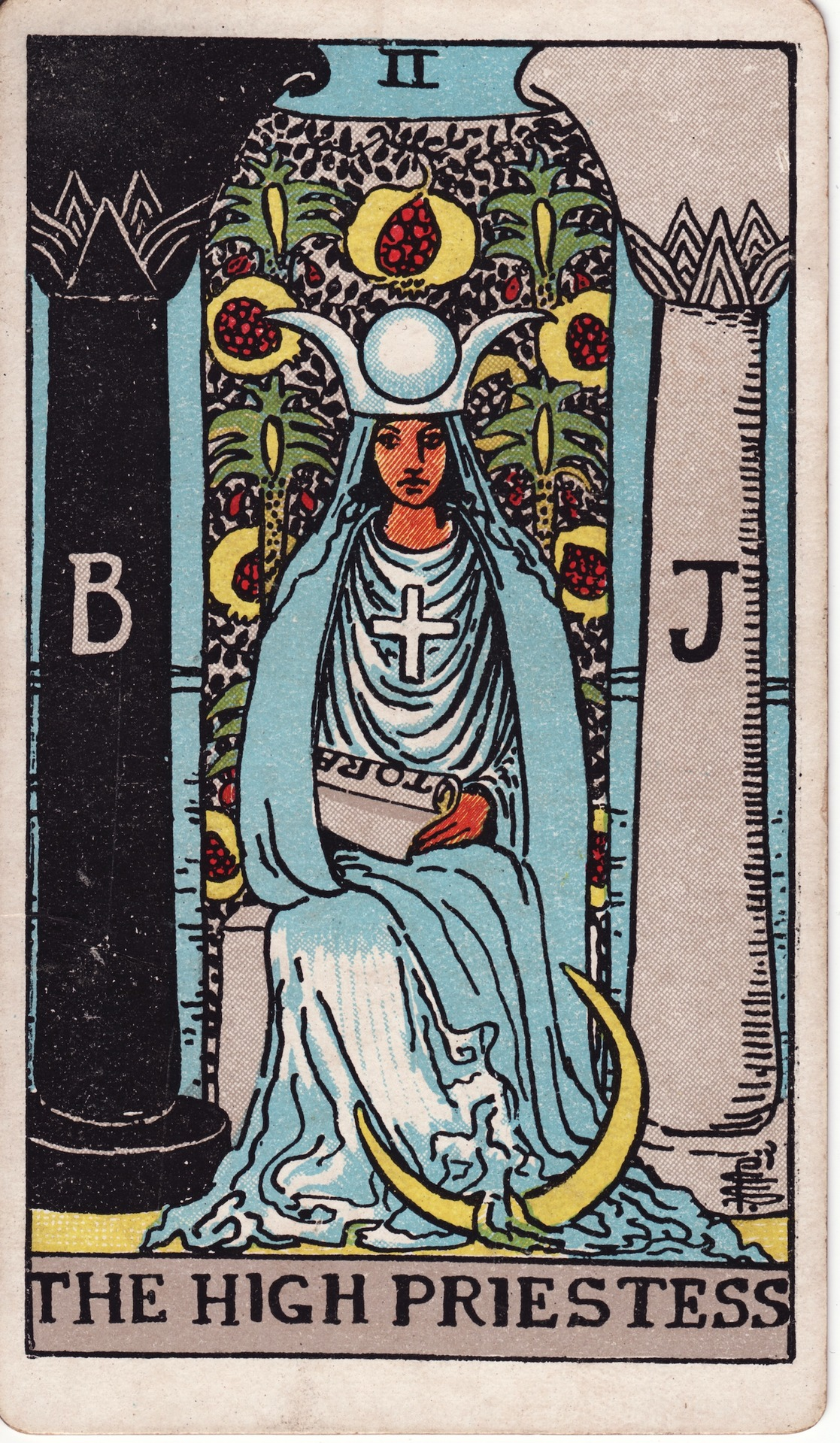
The High Priestess or The Popess (II) in the Rider–Waite Tarot, depicted with the pillars of Boaz and Jachin

The High Priestess (II) is the second Major Arcana card in cartomantic Tarot decks. It is based on the 2nd trump of Tarot card packs. In the first Tarot pack with inscriptions, the 18th-century woodcut Tarot de Marseilles, this figure is crowned with the Papal tiara and labelled La Papesse, the Popess, a possible reference to the legend of Pope Joan.

In the creation of the Rider–Waite Tarot deck, the Popess of the playing card packs was changed into The High Priestess of cartomantic cards. She wears a crown similar to the one used by the goddess Hathor, and is depicted with Marian imagery. A. E. Waite, the co-creator of the Rider–Waite deck, speculated that the card was connected to the ancient cult of Astarte or Mary as a representation of the Mother goddess.

== History ==
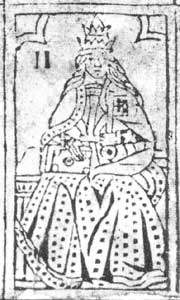
An untitled Popess on the "Rosenwald Sheet" of uncut Tarot woodcut designs, late 15th-early 16th century (National Gallery, Washington)

=== La Papesse ===
This Tarot card was originally called La Papesse, or "The Popess". Some of the cards directly linked the woman on the cards to the papacy by showing the woman wearing a triregnum or Papal Tiara. There are also some modern versions of the Tarot of Marseilles which include the keys to the kingdom that are a traditional symbol of the papacy. In Protestant post-reformation countries, Tarot cards in particular used images of the legendary Pope Joan, linking in to the mythology of how Joan, disguised as a man, was elected to the papacy and was only supposedly discovered to be a woman when she gave birth.

=== Other variants ===
In the Rider–Waite Tarot, illustrated by Pamela Coleman Smith, the Popess was changed into The High Priestess sitting between the pillars of Boaz and Jachin (which has a particular meaning to Freemasonry). She wears a crown similar to the Egyptian goddess Hathor and is depicted with the Marian imagery of a blue mantle and the moon at her feet. A. E. Waite, the co-creator of the Rider–Waite deck, dismissed the idea that the card originally depicted Pope Joan and speculated that it was instead connected to the ancient cult of Astarte.

Other variants that came after Rider–Waite are the Virgin Mary, Isis, the metaphorical Bride of Christ or Holy Mother Church. In Swiss Troccas decks, she is called Junon ("Juno"), the Roman Queen of the Gods. The "Flemish Deck" by Vandenborre (c. 1750-1760) refers to this card as Le Espagnol Capitano Eracasse ("The Spanish Captain Fracasse"), after a version of Il Capitano, a character from Commedia dell'Arte.

=== Sister Manfreda ===
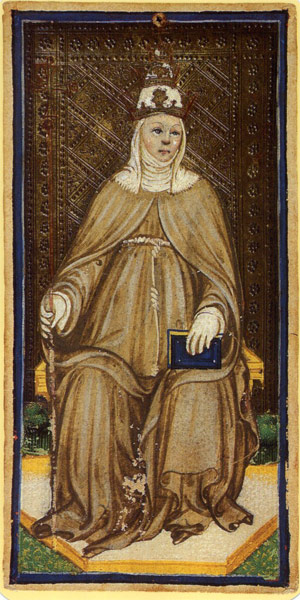
Visconti-Sforza Tarot card

La Papessa in the Visconti-Sforza Tarot has been identified as a depiction of Sister Manfreda, an Umiliata nun and a relative of the Visconti family who was elected Pope by the heretical Guglielmite sect of Lombardy. In The Tarot Cards Painted by Bonifacio Bembo, Gertrude Moakley writes:

Their leader, Guglielma of Bohemia, had died in Milan in 1281. The most enthusiastic of her followers believed that she was the incarnation of the Holy Spirit, sent to inaugurate the new age of the Spirit prophesied by Joachim of Flora. They believed that Guglielma would return to earth on the Feast of Pentecost in the year 1300, and that the male dominated Papacy would then pass away, yielding to a line of female Popes. In preparation for this event they elected Sister Manfreda the first of the Popesses, and several wealthy families of Lombardy provided at great cost the sacred vessels they expected her to use when she said Mass in Rome at the Church of Santa Maria Maggiore. Naturally, the Inquisition exterminated this new sect, and the "Popess" was burned at the stake in the autumn of 1300. Later the Inquisition proceeded against Matteo Visconti, the first Duke of Milan [sic], for his very slight connections with the sect.

This identification has been supported by other Tarot historians, such as Michael Dummett in his book The Visconti-Sforza Tarot Cards.

== Symbolism ==
=== Rider–Waite symbolism ===
In the Rider–Waite–Smith tarot, the basis for many modern tarot decks, The High Priestess is identified with the Shekhinah, the female indwelling presence of the divine. She wears plain blue robes and sits with her hands in her lap. She has a lunar crescent at her feet, "a horned diadem on her head, with a globe in the middle place" similar to the crown of the ancient Egyptian goddess Hathor, but with the horns having a shape more like half-crescents, and a large cross on her breast, the balance between the four elements: fire, water, earth, and air. The scroll in her hands, partly covered by her mantle, bears the letters TORA (meaning "divine law"), that symbolizes the memory we carry inside about the past, present and future, named Akasha. She is seated between the white and black pillars—'J' and 'B' for Jachin and Boaz—of the mystic Temple of Solomon. The veil of the Temple is behind her: it is embroidered with palm leaves (male) and pomegranates (female), growing on a tree shaped like the Tree of Life.

The motif that hangs behind the High Priestess’s throne, veiling whatever mysteries she guards, is suggested in the pattern of The Empress' gown. The two are sisters, one bringing life into the world, the other inviting the living to the esoteric mysteries. Further behind appears a body of water, likely the sea, with water flowing through most cards of the Rider–Waite–Smith tarot.

=== Tarot of Marseilles symbolism ===
In the Tarot of Marseilles it is noticeable that she wears a blue cape and red robe, in contrast to The Pope, wearing a red cape and blue robe.

== Interpretation ==
The modern interpretation of the High Priestess represents the unknown, mystery, intuition, spiritual knowledge, and the subconscious mind. She is an esoteric figure, unlike The Hierophant. Reversed, the High Priestess can be interpreted as secrecy and disconnection from your intuition.

According to A. E. Waite's 1910 book The Pictorial Key to the Tarot, the High Priestess card is associated with:

Secrets, mystery, the future as yet unrevealed; the woman who interests the Querent, if male; the Querent herself, if female; silence, tenacity; mystery, wisdom, science. Reversed: Passion, moral or physical ardor, conceit, surface knowledge.

In astrology, the High Priestess's primary correspondence is to the Moon. On the Tree of Life, she is on the path leading from Kether to Tiphareth.
