= Grand Hotel Brunate =

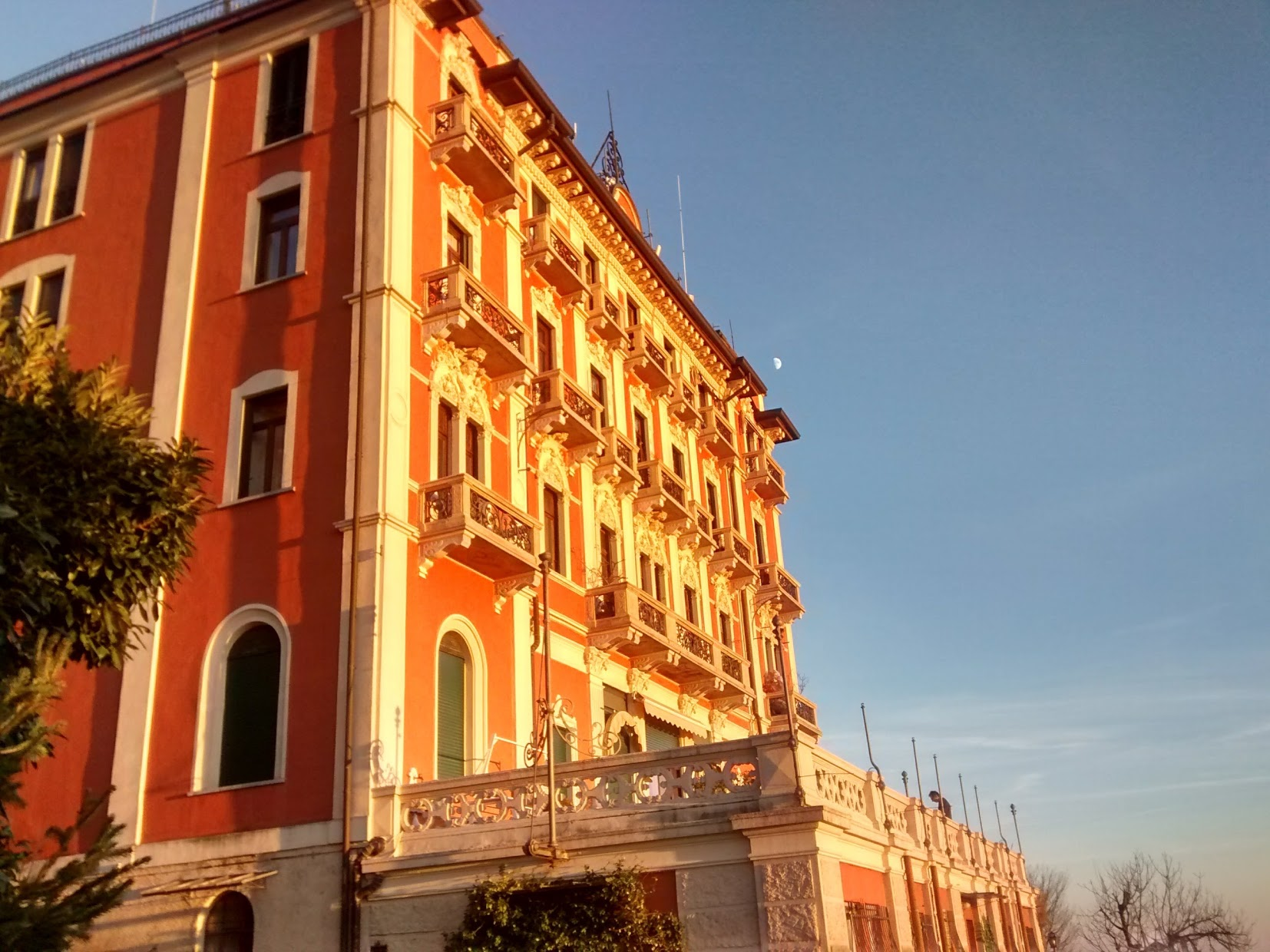
- Interactive map of the Grand Hotel Brunate area

General information
- Architectural style: Art Nouveau
- Location: Lombardy, Via A. Volta, Brunate, ITA
- Coordinates: 45.8177°N 9.095°E
- Construction started: 1891
- Construction stopped: 1893

Technical details
- Floor count: 5

Design and construction
- Architect: Giuseppe Casartelli

Other information
- Number of rooms: 50

The Grand Hotel Brunate was the last work in the Art Nouveau style by the architect Giuseppe Casartelli. Located in Brunate, in province of Como, its construction was concluded in 1893, one year before the construction of the Como–Brunate funicular. Nowadays, after a renovation of the property, it is composed of private apartments.

== Architecture ==
Located at the Pizz area in Brunate with a panoramic view over Como outside of the historical centre, it is composed of five floors, with different proportions related to the nearby villas but in line with the great hotel structures present in Italy and in Europe at the time.

The floorplan is rectangular and its façade has six neoclassical lesenes that alternates with large single and double windows surmounted by important stuccos that give movement to the façade together with the balconies, to which its parapets parts are in wrought iron. On the ground floor there is a large veranda overlooked by a large terrace supported by columns..

The hotel had fifty rooms: on the ground floor and the first floor there were the rooms for vestibule, dining room, leisure room and smoking room, while on the upper floors there were the guest rooms and suites. The decorations were done by the painter Travaglini from Varese.

The hotel stopped operations right after the Second World War, and in the 1960s it was restructured and converted into a residential condominium.
