= Moakler =

Moakler is a surname. Notable people with the surname include:

- Shanna Moakler (born 1975), American model and actress
- Steve Moakler (born 1988), American country musician and songwriter

== See also ==
- Moakley
