= Guglielma =

Italian noblewoman (1210–1281)

Saint Guglielma
- Born: 13th century Bohemia or Italy
- Died: c. 1279-1282; Chiaravalle, Milan, Holy Roman Empire (now Italy)
- Venerated in: Folk Catholicism
- Patronage: Brunate (unofficially)

Guglielma or Wilhelmina of Bohemia (Italian: Guglielma Boema; Czech: Vilemína or Blažena; 1210 – 24 October 1281) was an Italian noblewoman, possibly of Czech/Bohemian origin, according to her own assertions the daughter of king Ottokar I of Bohemia. She practiced and preached an alternative, feminized version of Christianity in which she predicted the end of time and her own resurrection as the Holy Spirit incarnate. She is now the unofficial patron saint of Brunate. A painting from ca. 1450 depicting Guglielma blessing Abbess Maddalena Albrizzi and an unknown donor hangs in the Church of San Andrea in Brunate. Barbara Newman has attempted to identify the kneeling figures in the painting as Guglielma's followers, Sister Maifreda da Pirovano and Andrea Saramita, but this is contested.

== Life ==
Guglielma arrived in Milan around 1260 with her son. Apparently a widow, she adopted the life of a pinzochera — a religious woman living independently in her own home, much like the beguines of northern Europe. In Milan she soon attracted disciples from the elite classes of the city, as well as among the Umiliati, a lay urban religious movement that operated on the fringes of heresy. When she died, some time between 1279 and 1282, her body was buried in the Cistercian monastery at Chiaravalle; the burial site soon became a shrine and a cult sprang up around her. The Guglielmites were led by a sister of the Umiliati movement, Maifreda da Piovano, who was elected their pope and performed Mass over Guglielma's grave. Maifreda was the first cousin of Matteo Visconti, the Ghibelline (anti-papal party) ruler of Milan.

Their creed declared that Guglielma's resurrection would herald a new church led by women. For obvious reasons, this attracted the attention of the Inquisition. In 1300, thirty Guglielmites were charged with heresy. Guglielma herself was posthumously condemned on the basis of a confession almost certainly extracted by torture from Andrea Saramita, one of Guglielma's most fervent disciples during her lifetime. Guglielma's bones were disinterred and burned, and three of her devotees, including Maifreda, were sent to the stake.

== Daughter of the King of Bohemia? ==
Since the inquisitors burned her followers' original writings, the only surviving primary source regarding Guglielma's life is the record of the trials of her followers (Milan, Biblioteca Ambrosiana A.227), which is itself incomplete but includes four official notebooks filled with interrogations and depositions.

When questioning Saramita, the inquisitors asked "if he knew or had heard where this Guglielma was from. He answered yes, she was a daughter of the late King of Bohemia, as it was said. Asked if he had sought out the truth concerning this, he answered yes: he, Andrea, had gone to the king of Bohemia and found the king dead, and found that it was so." This cryptic testimony was confirmed by a secular priest, Mirano da Garbagnate, who had accompanied Saramita on his journey from Milan to Prague. In February 1302, long after the burning of Guglielma's bones, the lay brother Marchisio Secco testified in the mopping-up phase of the trial that she "had been a woman of good birth, and it was said that she was a sister of the king of Bohemia."

The kings in question would have been Premysl Otakar I (regn. 1198–1230), Guglielma's father, and his son and heir, Wenceslas or Vaclav I (regn. 1230–1253).

If Guglielma was a daughter of Premysl Otakar I by his second wife, Queen Constance of Hungary, then she was also a first cousin of St. Elizabeth of Hungary (d. 1231); a half-sister of Dagmar of Bohemia (d. 1212/13), who married King Waldemar II of Denmark and was revered as a saint in that land; and a full sister of St. Agnes of Prague (d. 1282), a Poor Clare abbess whose canonization was first proposed in 1328, though not achieved until 1989. However, Guglielma couldn't be her true name if she was born in Bohemia. Since it is the Italian translation of the name Vilemína or alternatively Božena, it is argued she could have been born under that name. The only problem with this scenario is the absence of any corroborating Bohemian documents for any child born after Agnes (1211), although Constance was only in her early 30s at the time.

== The reemergence of Saint Guglielma ==
A full-length hagiographic vita, written in 1425 by Antonio Bonfadini, a friar of Ferrara (d. 1428), reveals that St. Guglielma's popular cult had not only survived the inquisition of 1300, but spread well beyond the confines of Milan. Nothing is known of this author except that he also produced a collection of sermons and one other vernacular saint's life.

Bonfadini's vita did not circulate widely. In fact, it survives in a single manuscript, which remained with the Franciscan friars of Ferrara until the time of Napoleon. But either his text or one derived from it eventually reached a Florentine humanist, Antonia Pulci (1452–1501), whose version gave the tale far greater currency. Pulci was a playwright who wrote convent dramas; after her husband's death in 1487 she lived as a pinzochera in Florence, just as Guglielma herself had done two centuries earlier in Milan. The Play of Saint Guglielma, one of seven dramas in Pulci's canon, versifies Bonfadini's legend in rhyming eight-line stanzas broken up among the dramatis personae, and wisely simplifies its plot.

== Visconti family and Guglielma ==
Manifreda da Pirovano was a first cousin of Matteo Visconti, who since 1287 had been Captain General and by 1300 was lord of Milan. Barbara Newman theorizes that Matteo Visconti confiscated and ultimately preserved the inquisitorial record of the trail of Guglielma and her followers.

Newman also writes: "Guglielma's heretication had tarnished the career of Milan's first lord, Matteo Visconti, but in compensation her sanctity would brighten the life of the last Visconti, Duchess Bianca Maria (1424-68), the wife of the military captain Francesco Sforza."

The Papessa card of the Visconti-Sforza tarot deck, commissioned by Duchess Bianca Maria Visconti, represents Sister Maifreda da Pirovano-an attribution first made by Gertrude Moakley in 1966, well before modern historians had rediscovered the Guglielmites.

Bianca Maria was also the patron of the painting depicting Saint Guglielma that still hangs in the Church of San Andrea in Brunate. Founded by two sisters as a hermitage in 1340, the tiny church of San Andrea was a poor, struggling monastery of nuns for almost three hundred years before Maddalena Albrizzi decided to enter it around 1420. Albrizzi came of a distinguished family in Como, so her choice of the austere Brunate rather than Santa Margherita, the aristocratic Benedictine house she had first planned to enter, is quite surprising.

Newman concludes her study with this: "Thus two women of the fifteenth century, a devout princess and a spiritually ambitious nun, joined forces to revive the good fame of two other women — a devout princess and a spiritually ambitious nun — who had long ago fired their friends with hope and ardor."

== Bibliography ==
- Patrizia Costa, Guglielma la Boema, l'"eretica" di Chiaravalle (Milan: NED, 1985)
- Luisa Muraro, Guglielma e Maifreda: Storia di un'eresia femminista (Milan: Tartaruga, 1985)
- Marina Benedetti, Io non sono Dio: Guglielma di Milano e i Figli dello Spirito santo (Milan: Edizioni Biblioteca Francescana, 1998)
