= Sant'Andrea Apostolo, Brunate =

Sant'Andrea Apostolo
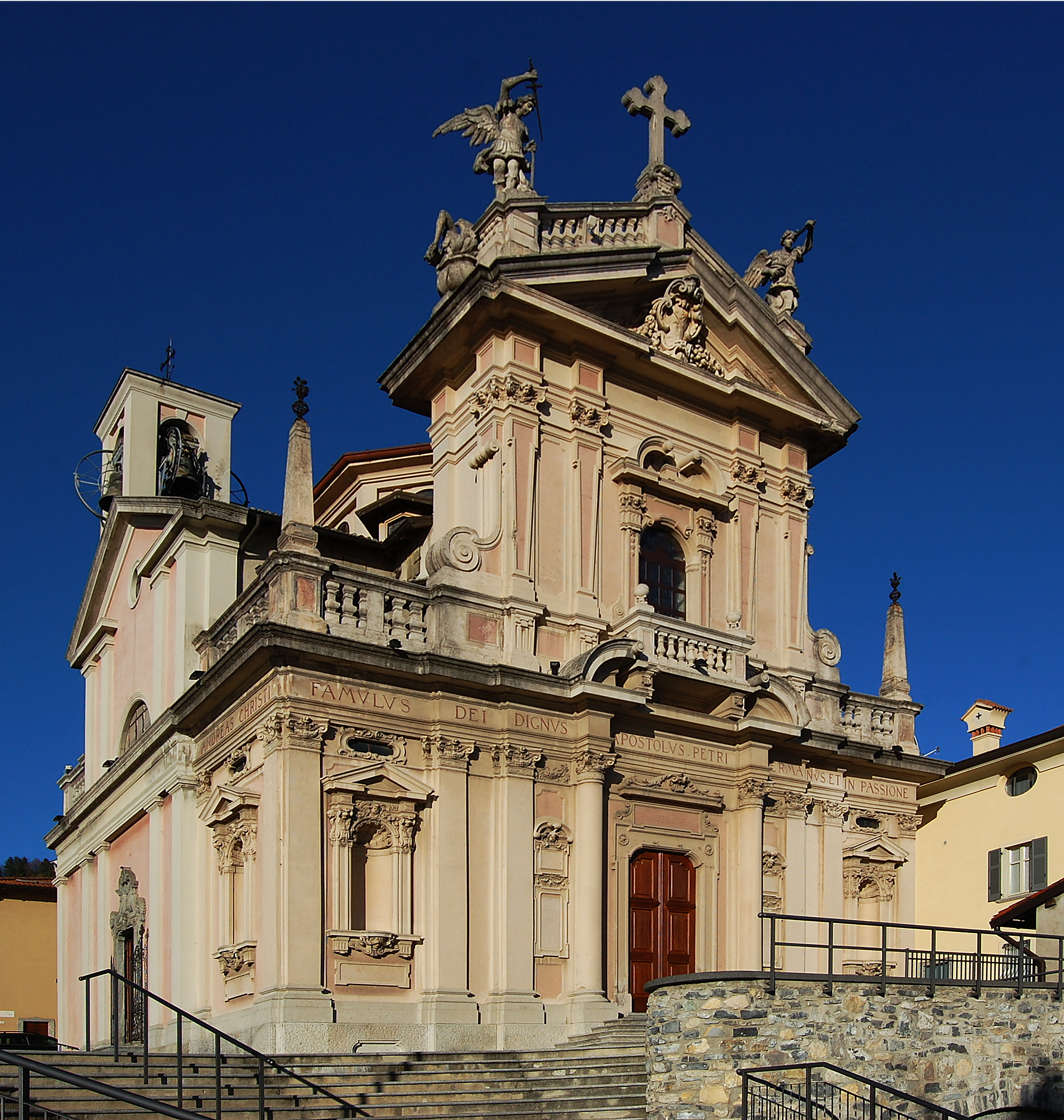
- The building's exterior in 2008
- Sant'Andrea Apostolo
- Location: Brunate
- Country: Italy

Sant'Andrea Apostolo is a church in Brunate, Lombardy, Italy.
