= The Hierophant =

Tarot card of the Major Arcana

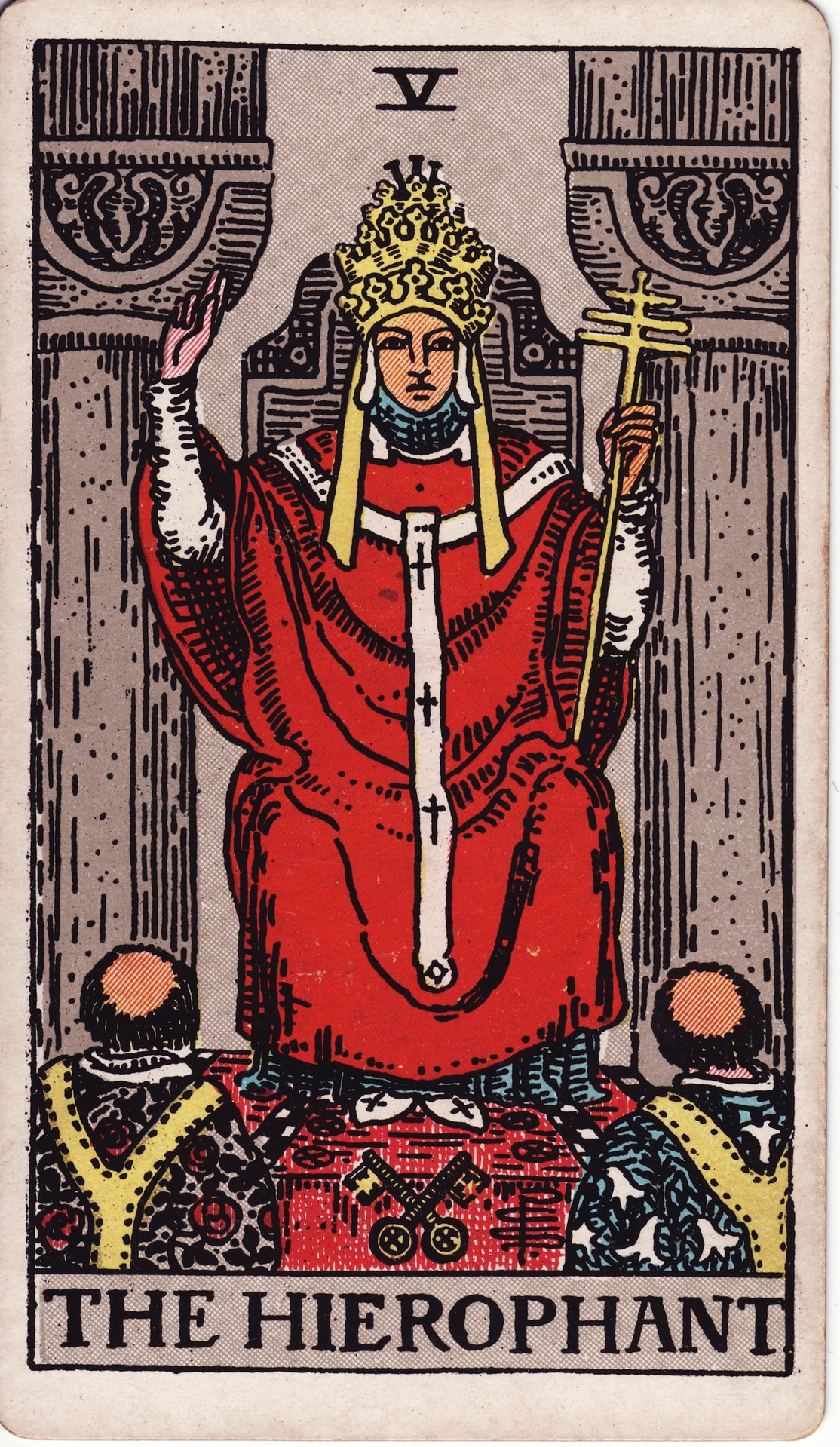
The Hierophant (V) in the Rider–Waite tarot deck

The Hierophant (V), alternatively depicted as The Pope or The High Priest (as a counterpart to "The High Priestess") is the fifth card of the Major Arcana in occult Tarot decks used in divination. It was identified as the Pope in early decks like Tarot of Marseilles, while modern decks like Rider–Waite Tarot may use the term hierophant (Ancient Greek: ἱεροφάντης), a person who brings religious congregants into the presence of that which is deemed "holy".

== Description and symbolism ==
In many modern packs, the Hierophant is represented with his right hand raised in blessing or benediction, with two fingers pointing skyward and two pointing down, thus forming a bridge between Heaven and Hell reminiscent of that formed by the body of The Hanged Man. The Hierophant is thus a true "pontiff", in that he is the builder of the bridge between deity and humanity. In his left hand he holds a triple cross. His tiara has three nails projecting from it, symbolizing the crucifixion of Jesus. The Hierophant is typically male, even in decks that take a feminist view of the Tarot, such as the Motherpeace Tarot. The Hierophant was also known as "The Teacher of Wisdom".

In most iconographic depictions, the Hierophant is seen seated on a throne between two pillars symbolizing Law and Freedom or obedience and disobedience, according to different interpretations. He wears a papal tiara, and the keys to Heaven are at his feet. Sometimes he is shown with worshippers, as his alternate title is the Pope or, sometimes, Jupiter. These are often a pair of tonsured priests, who wear chasubles with both lily and roses motifs separately. The card is also known as "The High Priest", as a counterpart to "The High Priestess" (which itself is also sometimes known as "The Papess", as counterpart to "The Pope").

== History ==
The papacy was not just a religious force, but was a political and military force as well. When the tarot was invented, the Pope controlled a large portion of central Italy known as the Papal States. Renaissance culture did not question the abstract ideal of the Pope as God's human representative on Earth, but others involved in the religious Reformation of that Age would have disagreed. In Tarot of Marseilles, he wears a red cape and a blue robe, in contrast to The Papess, who wears a blue cape and red robe.

In occult circles, the more commonly encountered modern name "Hierophant" is due to Antoine Court de Gébelin and was an attempt to dechristianise the standard French tarot pack, the Tarot de Marseilles, out of a mistaken belief of a pre-Christian origin. According to de Gébelin, "hierophant" was the title of the chief priest in the Eleusinian Mysteries (an ancient Greek ritual). However, historical evidence shows that tarot cards were invented in Northern Italy in the first half of the 15th century and not in ancient Egypt.

== Interpretation ==
The Hierophant stands for righteousness, sacredness, hierarchical order, orthodoxy, and moral righteousness. He is an exoteric figure, in contrast to the esoteric symbolism of The High Priestess. Reversed, the Hierophant can be interpreted as standing for unorthodoxy, originality, and gullibility.

According to A.E. Waite's 1910 book Pictorial Key to the Tarot, the Hierophant card carries several divinatory associations:

5. THE HIEROPHANT.--Marriage, alliance, captivity, servitude; by another account, mercy, and goodness; inspiration; the man to whom the Querent has recourse. Reversed: Society, good understanding, concord, over kindness, weakness.

In astrology, the Hierophant is associated with the feminine, fixed-earth sign of Taurus and its ruling planet, Venus.
