= Moakley =

Moakley is a surname. Notable people with the surname include:

- Gertrude Moakley (1905–1998), American librarian and noted Tarot scholar
- Joe Moakley (1927–2001), American politician
- John Francis Moakley (1863–1955), American track and field coach
- Thomas Moakley, American politician
- Francis Xavier Moakley (1933-2010), American university professor

== See also ==
- John Joseph Moakley United States Courthouse
