= Antonia Tanini Pulci =

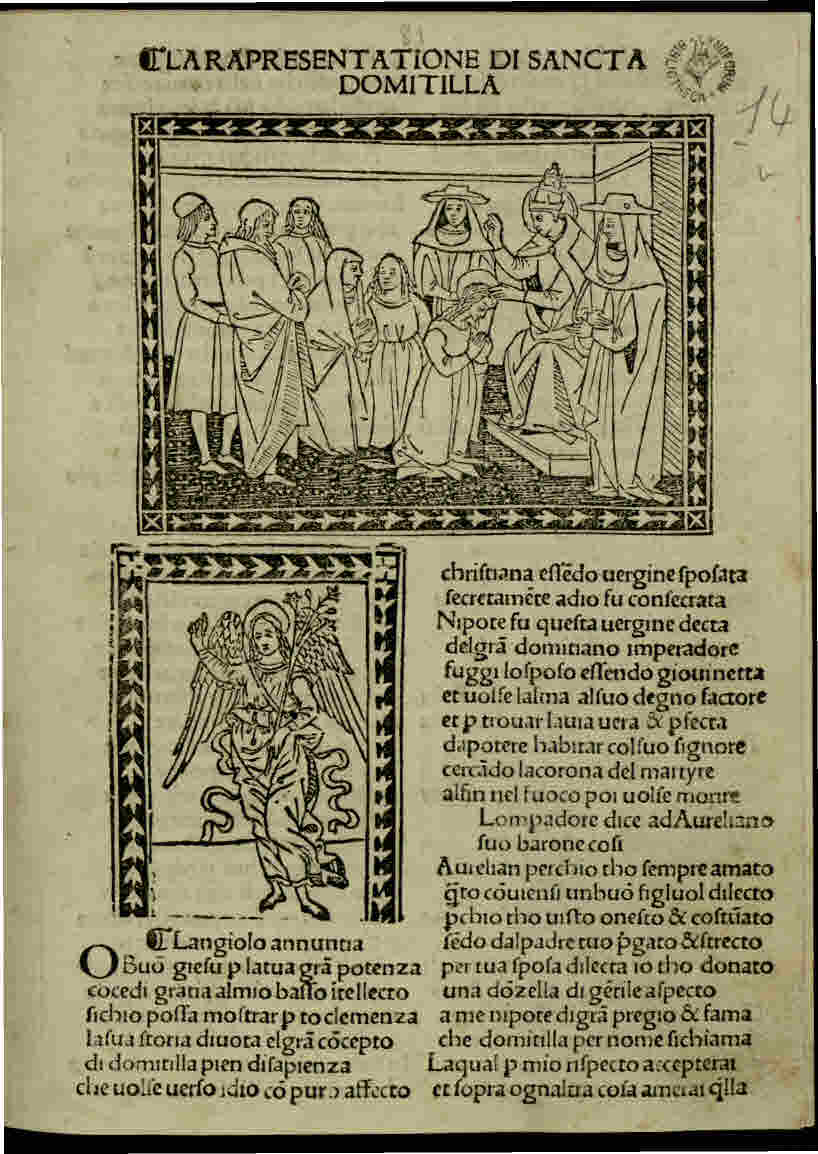
Rappresentazione di santa Domitilla (c.1495)

Antonia Tanini Pulci (1452/54 – 1501) was an Italian playwright whose works were published in several editions in the fifteenth and sixteenth centuries.

== Early life and family ==
Pulci was born sometime in Florence, Italy between 1452 and 1454. Her father was Francesco d'Antonio di Giannotto Tanini, an Italian merchant. Her mother was Jacopa di Torello di Lorenzo Torelli, a Roman from Trastevere. Pulci had five sisters and a brother along with a half brother and a half sister, who were her father's natural and firstborn children. Pulci's father died in 1467, when she was only about 13–15 years old. Four of Pulci's sisters married well, and at least one sister joined a local convent.

Antonia married Bernardo di Jacopo Pulci in either 1470 or 1471. Bernardo Pulci was notable in the literary sphere. He also held a notable position at the University of Florence.

While Pulci's husband did come from a distinguished family, Bernardo Pulci's family was eventually bankrupted by the eldest son's thoughtless investments. When the eldest son died in 1470, Bernardo and his other brothers were left to face the dishonor on their family; they had to take on the responsibility of supporting their family financially. So, Antonia's dowry of a thousand florins was of great help for solving the financial difficulties that Bernardo was forced to deal with. This was an impressive dowry for a merchant's daughter at the time.

== Career ==
Antonia Pulci established herself as a prominent playwright by creating several miracle plays, or sacra rappresentazione. A play of this genre is heavily based on a religious story found in the Bible. Typically, these plays are narrated by an angel, who all of the actions of the characters in the story. The angel ends by explaining the lesson to be learned from the tale in an epilogue, called l'angelo che licenzia.

Many of the plays that Antonia wrote may never have been performed. There is little to indicate that these plays were performed live in front of an audience. It is possible that these plays were intended to be read, although some of Antonia's more popular plays were acted out in later years.

=== Raccolta Miscomini ===
Her first play, dated 1483, is called Rappresentazione di Santa Domitilla (The Play of Saint Domitilla). This work was published in the 1490s together with several other plays. These include Rappresentazione di Santa Guglielma (The Play of Saint Guglielma) and Rappresentazione di San Francesco (The Play of Saint Francis). Rappresentazione di Giuseppe figlio di Giacob (The Play of Joseph, Son of Jacob) was also published at the same time, and it was possibly written by Antonia, although it is uncertain. Together, these plays were published in the two volume anthology of sacre rappresentazioni called the “Raccolta Miscomini.” It was probably named after Antonio Miscomini, the person that may have published the work. Also included in the Raccolta Miscomini is Bernardo Pulci's Rappresentazione di Barlaam e Giosafat (The Play of Barlaam and Josaphat).

=== Other works ===
A close friend of Antonia, Fra Antonio Dolciata, attributed a few works to her after her death. One of these plays was the one about the story of Joseph, son of Jacob, whose story is detailed in the Bible. Other works that Dolciata attributed to Antonia include the Rappresentazione del figliuol prodigo (The Play of the Prodigal Son) and Destruzione di Saul e il pianto di Davit (The Demise of Saul and the Tears of David).

== Later life and death ==
Antonia and Bernardo never had any children. In 1488, Bernardo died. Antonia became an ammantellata, which is a third order sister living in secular society. For a few years, she lived in San Vincenzo, at a Dominican convent called Annalena. Later, she spent some time living at her mother's house near Piazza della Signoria.

Later in life, she met Francesco Dolciati, a student from the cathedral school. She studied Latin with him before pursuing a more active role in her religion. She convinced Dolciati to enter the religious life, and he chose the Fra Antonio as his religious name in her honor. She spent many years studying Scripture and doing penance. This influenced her works; she continued to write, however she showcased the religious theme in the form of poems rather than plays. One of these poems was written on the corpus domini, the Feast of Corpus Chrisi, and it was given to Dolciati as an autographed gift.

Toward the end of her life, her dowry was finally returned from the Pulci family. Antonia used this money to purchase land outside of San Gallo, in between a monastery called Lapo and the Mugnone River. She retired here with a small group of Augustinian tertiaries and decided to establish a convent. In the last year of her life, she created a will which provided funding for the convent, which she named Santa Maria della Misericordia (it was also sometimes referred to as the Assunta).

She coordinated the building of the chapel of Santa Monica in the church of San Gallo. This was the church where Fra Antonio Dolciati had worked for several years. However, just about thirty years later, the convent was destroyed. Soon after the destruction of the church, the nuns of the convent that Antonia had established moved to the convent of San Clemente. The convent at San Clemente was seen as safer because it was inside the city walls of Via San Gallo rather than outside like the convent at Santa Maria della Misericordia.

== Analysis of the plays ==
=== Content ===
Mystery and miracle plays focused on the representation of Bible stories, and they reached their height of popularity during the 15th century before the rise of the professional theatre. Like many of the Florentine mystery and miracle plays of her time, Antonia's works usually remained rather close to their sources, with a few exceptions.

Her play entitled Destruzione di Saul e il pianto di Davit included some original writing. Here, some of her creative skills can be examined, because she included a story that is not found in the Bible. She wrote about the martyrdom of the wife of Saul.

Rappresentazione di San Francesco is another example of a play that Antonia created that did not follow its portrayal in the Bible closely. This play is unique because it includes allusions to Antonia's own life. Some of the characters are very similar to her family members. For example, the character Jacopa da Settesoli is renamed Jacopa da Roma. Antonia's mother was a Jacopa from Rome, so this may have been an homage to her

=== Form ===
Antonia's plays were written in her first language, Italian. The plays were very well written in “pleasant, recitable verse.” Usually, the plays were between 400 and 800 lines. They were written in ottava rima, which is the standard metre of epic and hagiographic verse narrative.

=== Publication ===
The plays were all published in various editions thought the fifteenth and sixteenth centuries. The works probably sustained their popularity because nuns could use them for convent theatre and devotional reading. The Santa Domitilla, the San Francesco, and the San Guglielma were the most often published out of all of the early editions of Antonia's plays. These plays (except the Santa Domitilla) have been included in various literary collections published in the nineteenth and twentieth centuries

== List of works ==
1. Rappresentazione di Santa Domitilla (The Play of Saint Domitilla)
2. Rappresentazione di Santa Guglielma (The Play of Saint Guglielma)
3. Rappresentazione di San Francesco (The Play of Saint Francis)
4. Rappresentazione di Giuseppe figlio di Giacob (The Play of Joseph, Son of Jacob)
5. Rappresentazione del figliuol prodigo (The Play of the Prodigal Son)
6. Destruzione di Saul e il pianto di Davit (The Demise of Saul and the Tears of David)
