= Maifreda da Pirovano =

Italian mystic

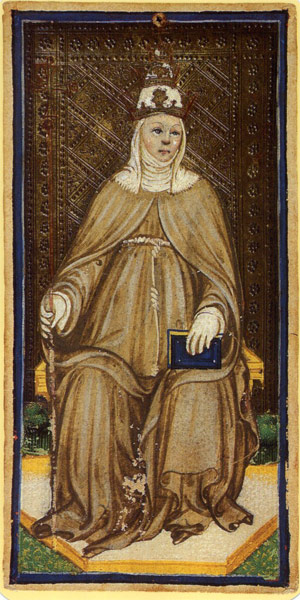
The Popess, card from the so-called Visconti-Sforza tarot deck drawn by Bonifacio Bembo

Maifreda da Pirovano (died 1300) was an Italian mystic.

She was a follower of the teachings of Guglielma.

She was executed for heresy in Milan, having been convicted by the Inquisition.
