= Como–Brunate funicular =

Funicular railway in Lombardy, Italy

Coordinates: 45.818381°N 9.089416°E

Overview
- Status: Open
- Owner: Region of Lombardy
- Locale: Lombardy, Italy
- Termini: Como; Brunate
- Stations: 4

Service
- Services: 1
- Operator: Azienda Trasporti Milanesi

History
- Opened: 1894

Technical
- Line length: 1,084 m (3,556 ft)
- Track gauge: 1,000 mm (3 ft 3 3/8 in) metre gauge
- Maximum incline: 55 %

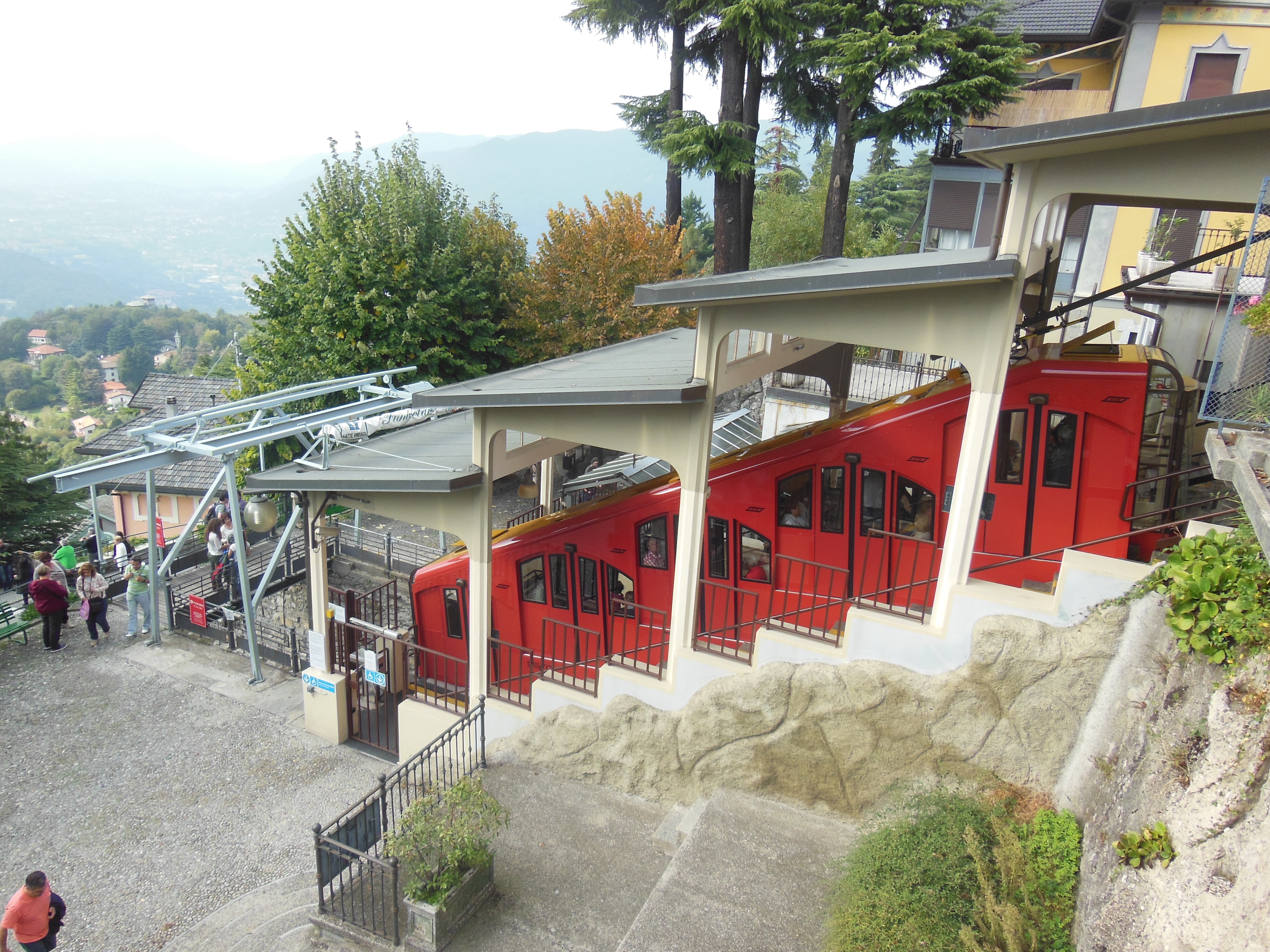
One of the latest funicular cars at the upper station

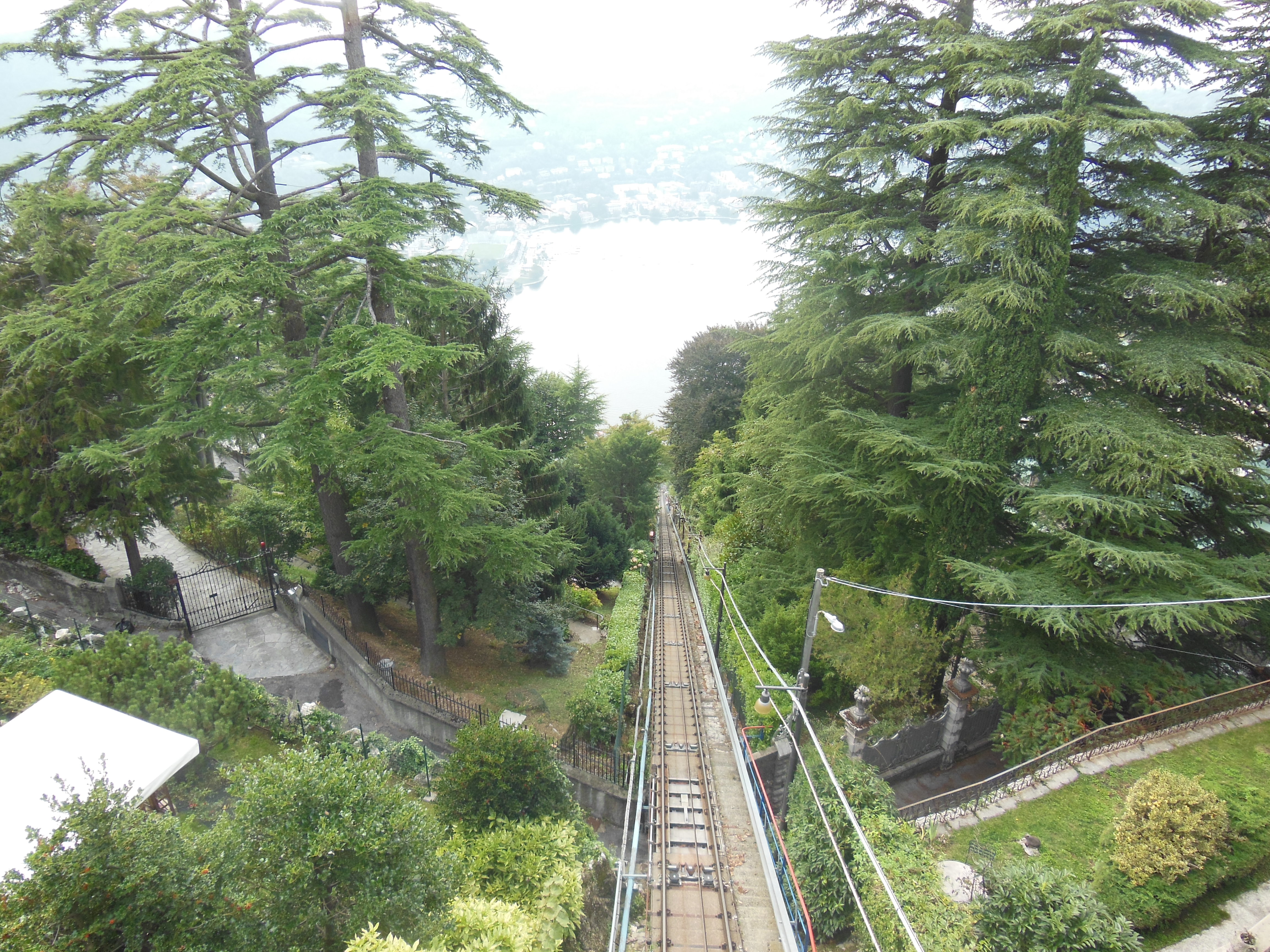
Looking down the line from just below the upper station; Lake Como can be seen below

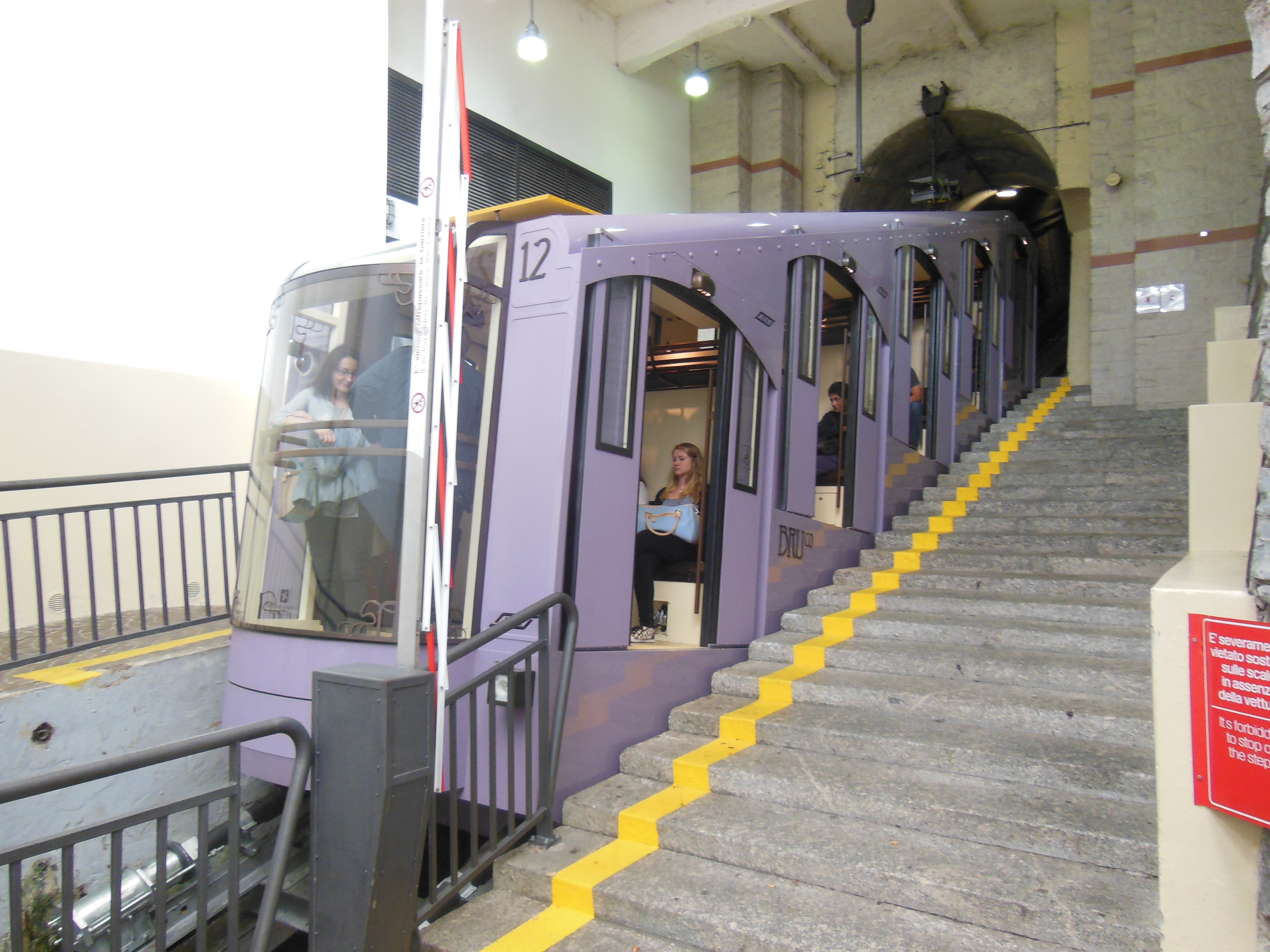
Another of the latest funicular cars in the lower station

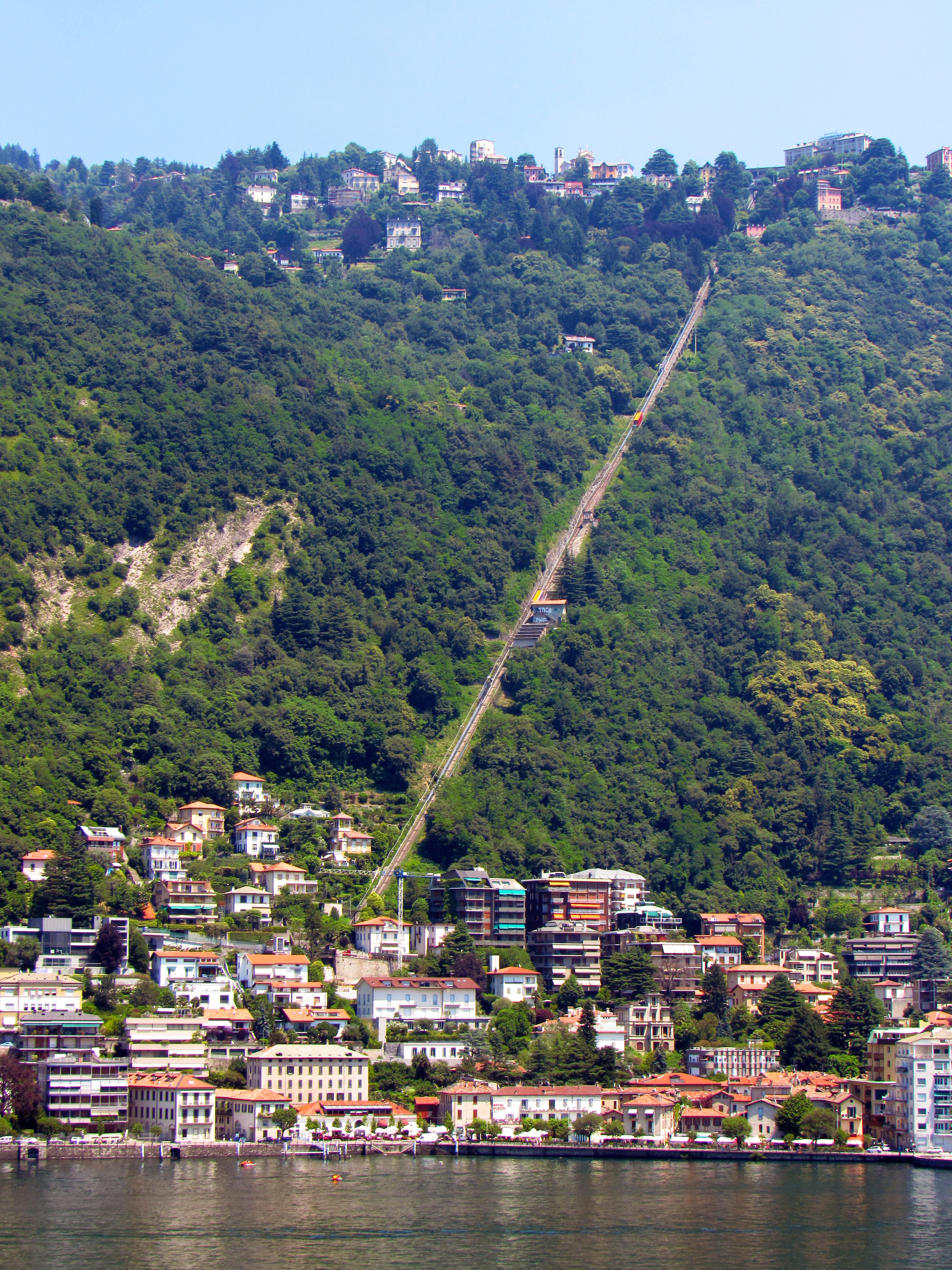
The route of the funicular seen from Lake Como

The Como–Brunate funicular (Italian: Funicolare Como-Brunate) is a funicular railway that connects the city of Como with the village of Brunate in Lombardy, Italy. The line has operated since 1894, and is used by both tourists and local residents.

== History ==
The funicular was opened in 1894 and was originally operated using a steam engine. In 1911 the traction system was converted to use an electric motor. The line was refurbished in 1934/5 and again in 1951, when new cars were provided.

In 1981 ownership of the funicular was transferred from the private Società Anonima Funicolare Como/Brunate to the government of the region of Lombardy. In 2005 the management of the funicular, along with Como's local bus service, was transferred to a local company, the Consorzio Mobilità Funicolare & Bus. The Consorzio further subcontracts the operation of the funicular to the Azienda Trasporti Milanesi S.p.A..

In mid-August 2011, the funicular reopened after an overhaul costing €800,000. New cars were constructed for the line by Gangloff at a cost of €1 million each. The new cars are air-conditioned, 12 metres (39 ft 4 in) long and 2.1 metres (6 ft 11 in) wide, and carry 81 passengers. The cars are painted in contrasting colours, one being lilac and the other red.

== Route ==
The lower station is situated adjacent to the Lake Como quayside to the north-east of Como city centre. It is some 400 metres (1,312 ft) north of the Como Lago railway station served by Trenord train services to Milan and 1.4 kilometres (0.87 mi) east of the Como San Giovanni railway station on the main Zurich to Milan railway.

The line is 1,084 metres (3,556 ft) long, of which the lower 130 metres (427 ft) are in tunnel. The remainder of the line is at or above ground level, with extensive views over the lake and city. There are two intermediate stops, served on request.

The upper station is situated in the centre of Brunate, with entrances and exits at both upper and lower levels. At the upper level, a piazza separates the station from the machine room, which has a gallery allowing public viewing of the haulage machinery. The surrounding area has vistas over Como and the lake, and is the starting point of many trails into the surrounding hills. Expect to wait 15-30 minutes depending on the line at the entrance. Buy your tickets at the kiosk as you first walk in for €7.20 per passenger for a round trip.

== Operation ==
The line has the following parameters:

Number of cars	2
Number of stops	4 (2 terminal, 2 intermediate)
Configuration	Single track with passing loop
Track length	1,084 metres (3,556 ft)
Track gauge	1,000 mm (3 ft 3 3/8 in)
Rise	496 metres (1,627 ft)
gradient	55%
Capacity	81 passengers per car
Frequency	Every 15 or 30 minutes
Maximum speed	3 metres per second (9.8 ft/s)
Travel time	7 minutes

== See also ==
- List of funicular railways
