= Gertrude Moakley =

American scholar and librarian (1905–1998)

Gertrude Charlotte Moakley
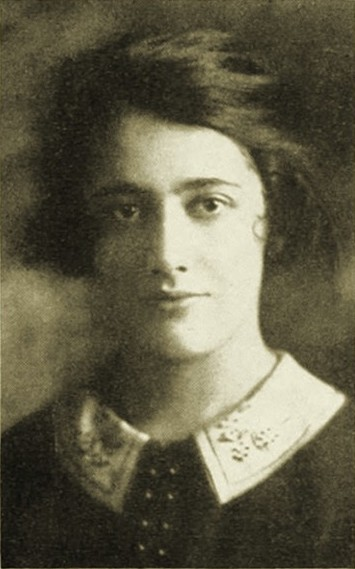
- 1925 Yearbook Photo (age 20)
- Born: February 18, 1905; Pittsburgh, Pennsylvania, U.S.
- Died: March 28, 1998 (aged 93); St. Petersburg, Florida, U.S.
- Education: Barnard College, Columbia University
- Occupation: Librarian
- Writing career
- Subjects: Library Science; the history and iconography of Tarot cards
- Notable work: The Tarot Cards Painted by Bonifacio Bembo

Gertrude Charlotte Moakley (February 18, 1905 – March 28, 1998) was an American librarian and a Tarot scholar. Moakley is notable for having written the earliest and most significant account of the iconography of Tarot, a card game which originated in the Italian Renaissance. She had worked at the New York Public Library.

Today, Tarot is both a popular game, and an object of fascination for occultists, fortune-tellers, and New Age enthusiasts around the world. Although Moakley wrote and spoke on these latter subjects (in Moakley, 1954; Papus, 1958; Waite, 1959), she is remembered for having written one of the few scholarly books about the history of Tarot and the meaning of the allegorical trump cards. Her 1956 article on the subject and her 1966 book were both praised by Erwin Panofsky, the foremost art historian of the Warburg School, as well as by Michael Dummett, the preeminent scholar of playing-card and Tarot history.

== Biography ==
Moakley was born in Pittsburgh, Pennsylvania, on February 18, 1905, to parents Arthur Irving Moakley and Josephine Henry (née Barrett).

She received a B.A. degree in classics from Barnard College in 1926 and a B.S. degree in library science from the Columbia University School of Library Service in 1928. While attending Barnard in 1926, she was awarded the Tatlock Prize.

After graduation, Moakley began working as a librarian for the New York Public Library (NYPL). She lectured on catalog arrangement at New York University, published articles in the NYPL Bulletin and the Journal of Cataloging and Classification. She served as chair of a special committee which revised the Filing Code of the NYPL Circulation Department.

Moakley had served as the chairperson for the American Library Association. She was also chairman of a committee that revised the ALA Rules for Filing Catalog Cards. She appears in directories of librarians from 1933 through 1970, and she published several books on filing codes.

She had moved to Florida in 1984. Moakley died in St. Petersburg, Florida, on March 28, 1998.

Waite-Smith Tarot

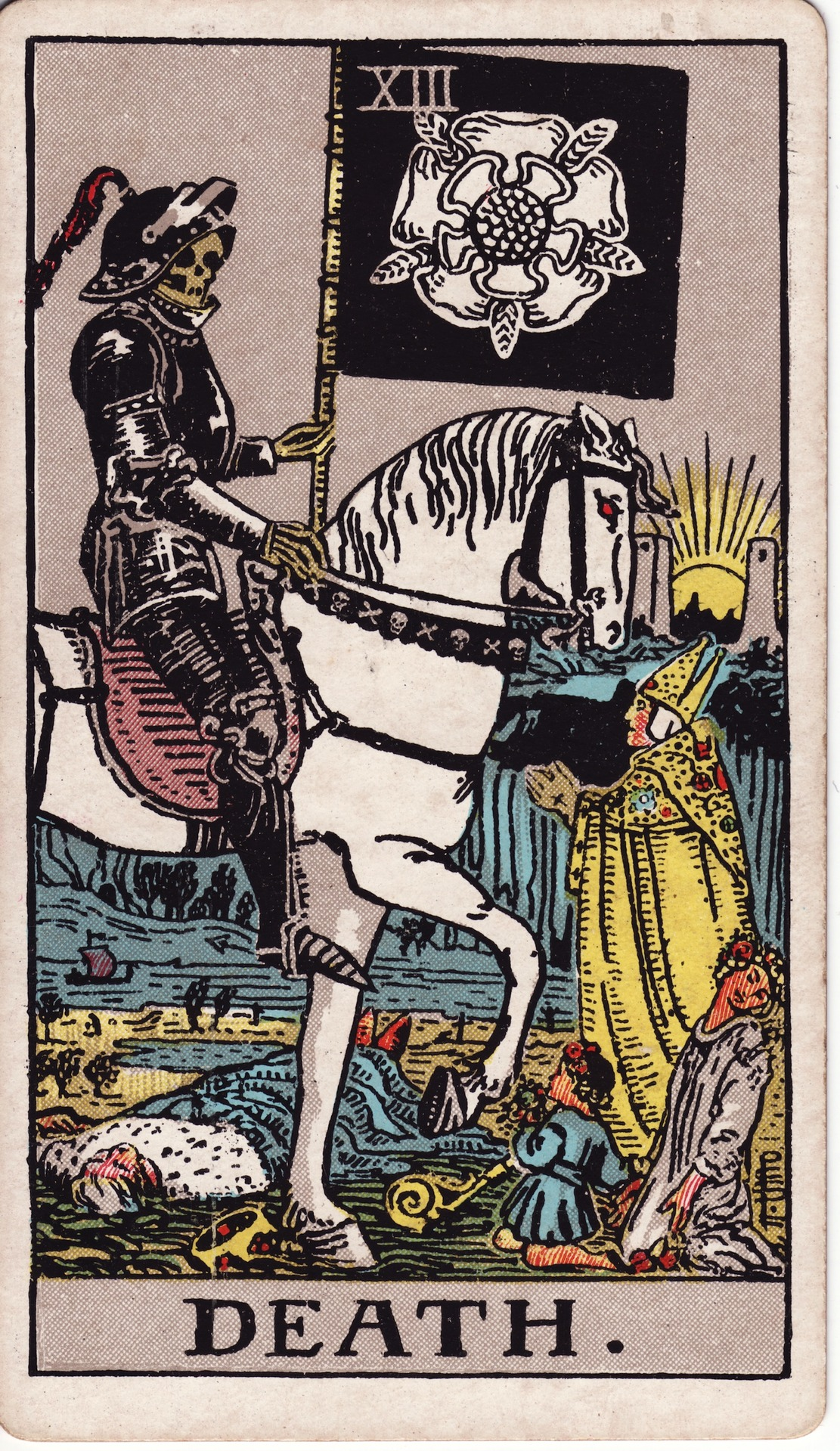
Death (by water) card

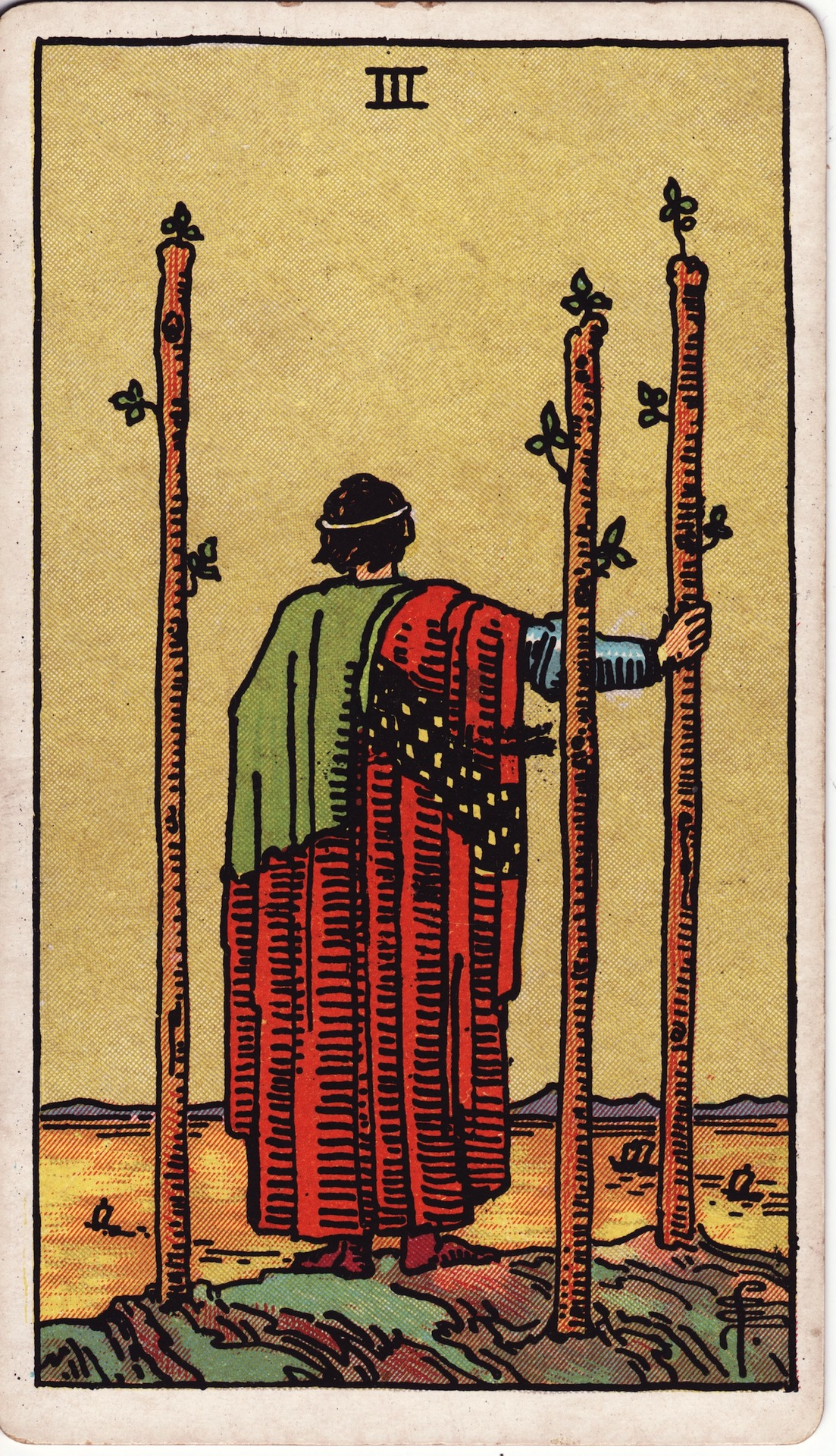
Three of Wands card

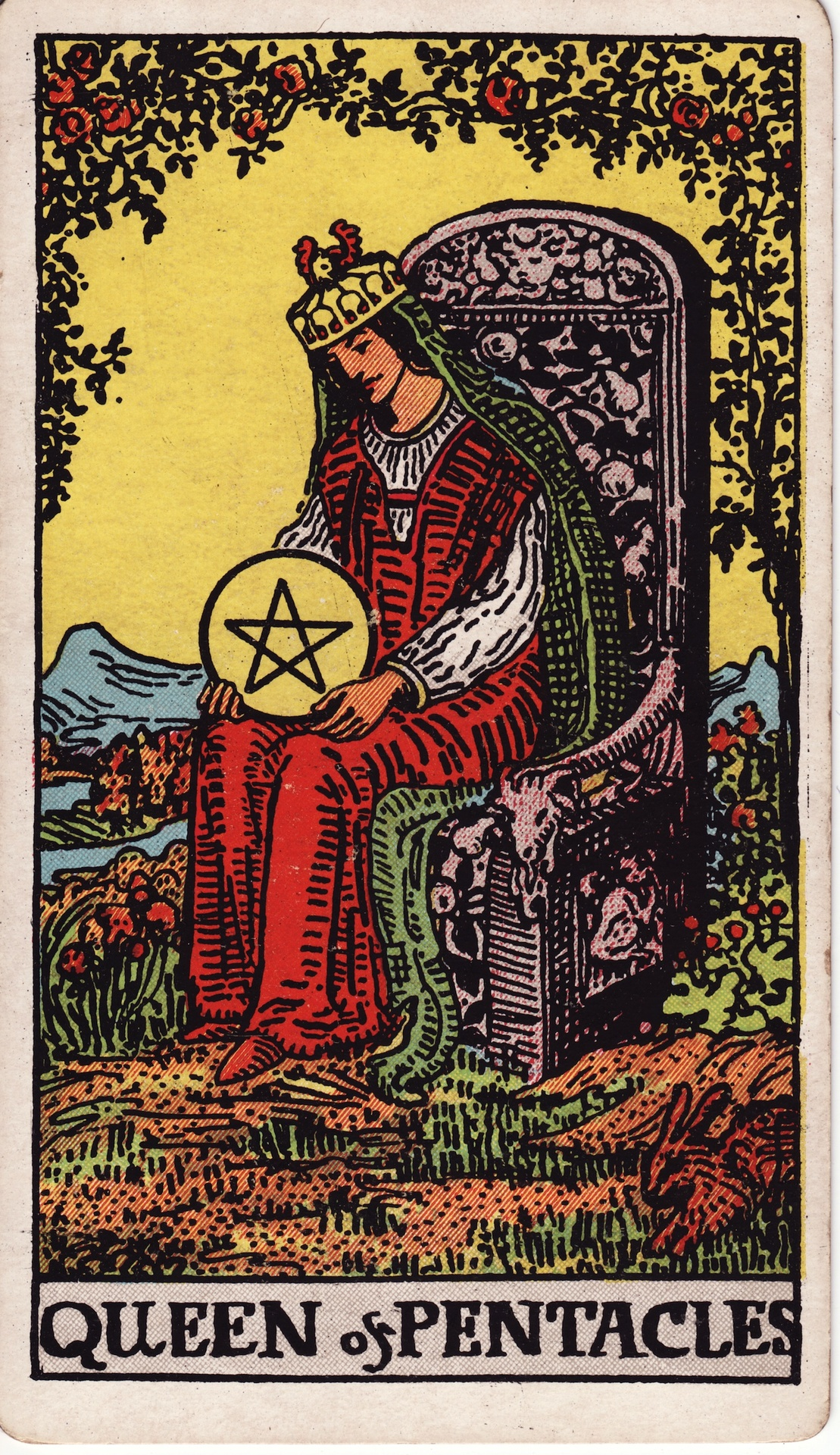
Queen of Pentacles card

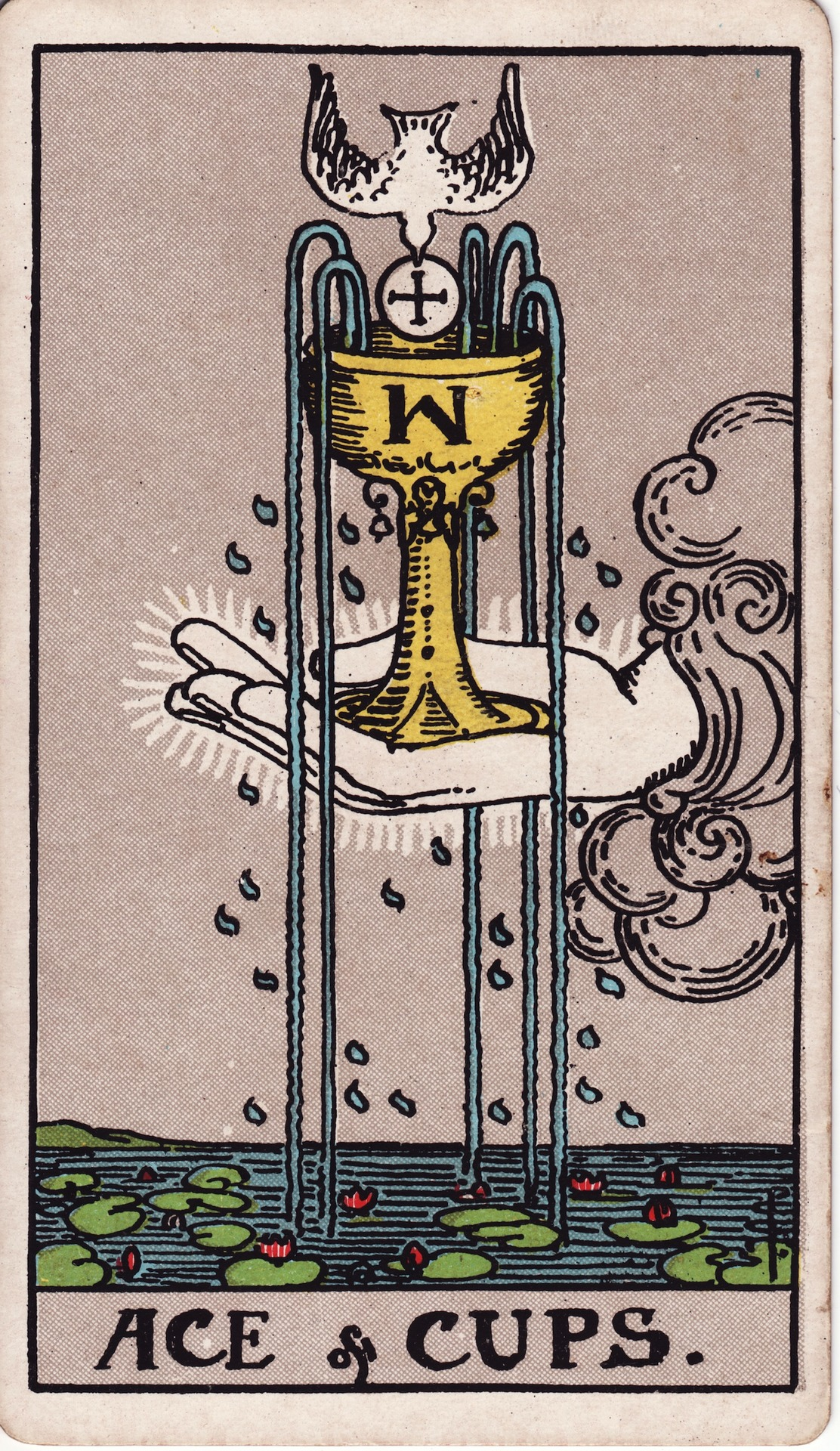
Ace of Cups card

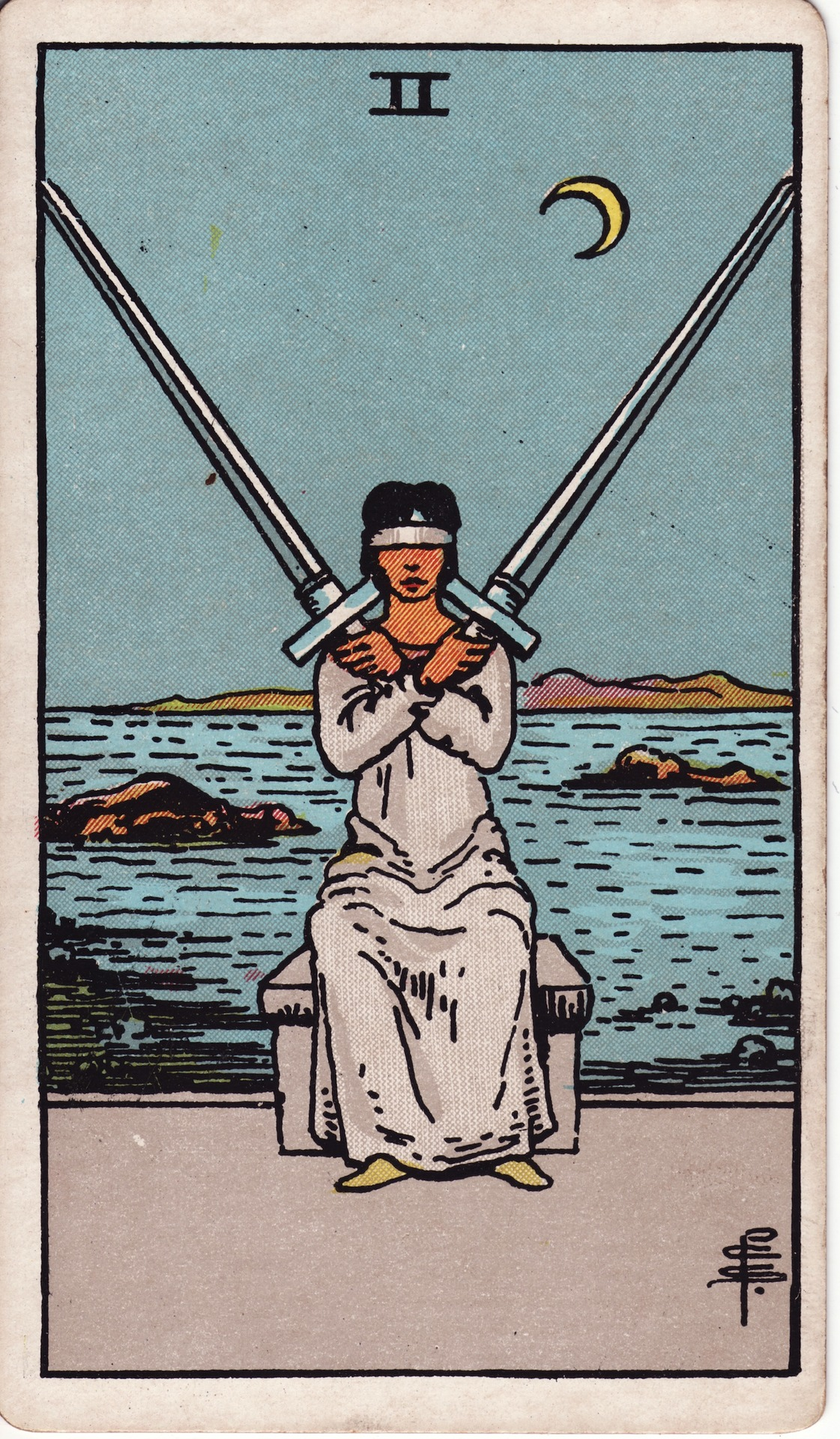
Two of swords card

== Moakley and modern tarot ==
The contemporary fascination with Tarot developed in the 1970s, but two decades earlier Moakley was writing and speaking about the subject. She published articles, wrote introductions for two of the most influential books on the subject, and was invited by Eden Gray to appear on the Long John Nebel late-night radio program (Note: Nebel's show was on WOR 710 in New York until 1964, and the program with Gray and Moakley was in May 1959.) In 1954, Moakley published an article, "The Waite-Smith Tarot: A Footnote to The Waste Land" about T.S. Eliot's use of Tarot motifs in his 1922 work The Waste Land.

Eliot referred to Tarot cards in the poem, in this famous passage:

Madame Sosostris, famous clairvoyante, Has a bad cold, nevertheless Is known to be the wisest woman in Europe, With a wicked pack of cards. Here, said she, Is your card, the drowned Phoenician Sailor. (Those are pearls that were his eyes. Look!) Here is Belladonna, the Lady of the Rocks, The lady of situations. Here is the man with three staves, and here the Wheel, And here is the one-eyed merchant, and this card, Which is blank, is something that he carries on his back, Which I am forbidden to see. I do not find The Hanged Man. Fear death by water.

In his notes to the poem, Eliot refers to the "traditional" Tarot deck. Moakley argued that he was actually alluding to the Waite-Smith Tarot deck. (Note: Eliot: "I am not familiar with the exact constitution of the Tarot pack of cards, from which I have obviously departed to suit my own convenience. The Hanged Man, a member of the traditional pack, fits my purpose in two ways: because he is associated in my mind with the Hanged God of Frazer, and because I associate him with the hooded figure in the passage of the disciples to Emmaus in Part V. The Phoenician Sailor and the Merchant appear later; also the 'crowds of people', and Death by Water is executed in Part IV. The Man with Three Staves (an authentic member of the Tarot pack) I associate, quite arbitrarily, with the Fisher King himself.") Traditional Tarot decks date back to the Fifteenth Century, while the Waite-Smith deck was created by Arthur Edward Waite little more than a decade before Eliot's poem. This modern deck incorporated many substantial differences from earlier decks. Moakley argued that "the man with three staves", which Eliot insisted was "an authentic member of the Tarot pack", confirms the identity of his deck as Waite-Smith, the only deck at that time to have such a card. Her article has been cited repeatedly in the literature on Eliot's poem.

In 1958, Waite's translation of Tarot of the Bohemians, by Gérard Encausse (Papus), was republished with an introduction by Moakley. As background, in the hope that even non-cultist readers might appreciate the book, she summarized some of the notable appropriations of the Tarot of the previous fifty years. These included Eliot, Jessie Weston's From Ritual to Romance, and Charles Williams' The Greater Trumps. She also mentioned W.B. Yeats's interest in the Tarot and the occult, and the relevance of Tarot to some of Carl Jung's followers. Moakley argued that understanding the Tarot required knowledge of both the literal facts of Tarot history and the mythic musings of artists and occultists. This dual focus is characteristic of the more thoughtful New Age writers who promote Tarot today.

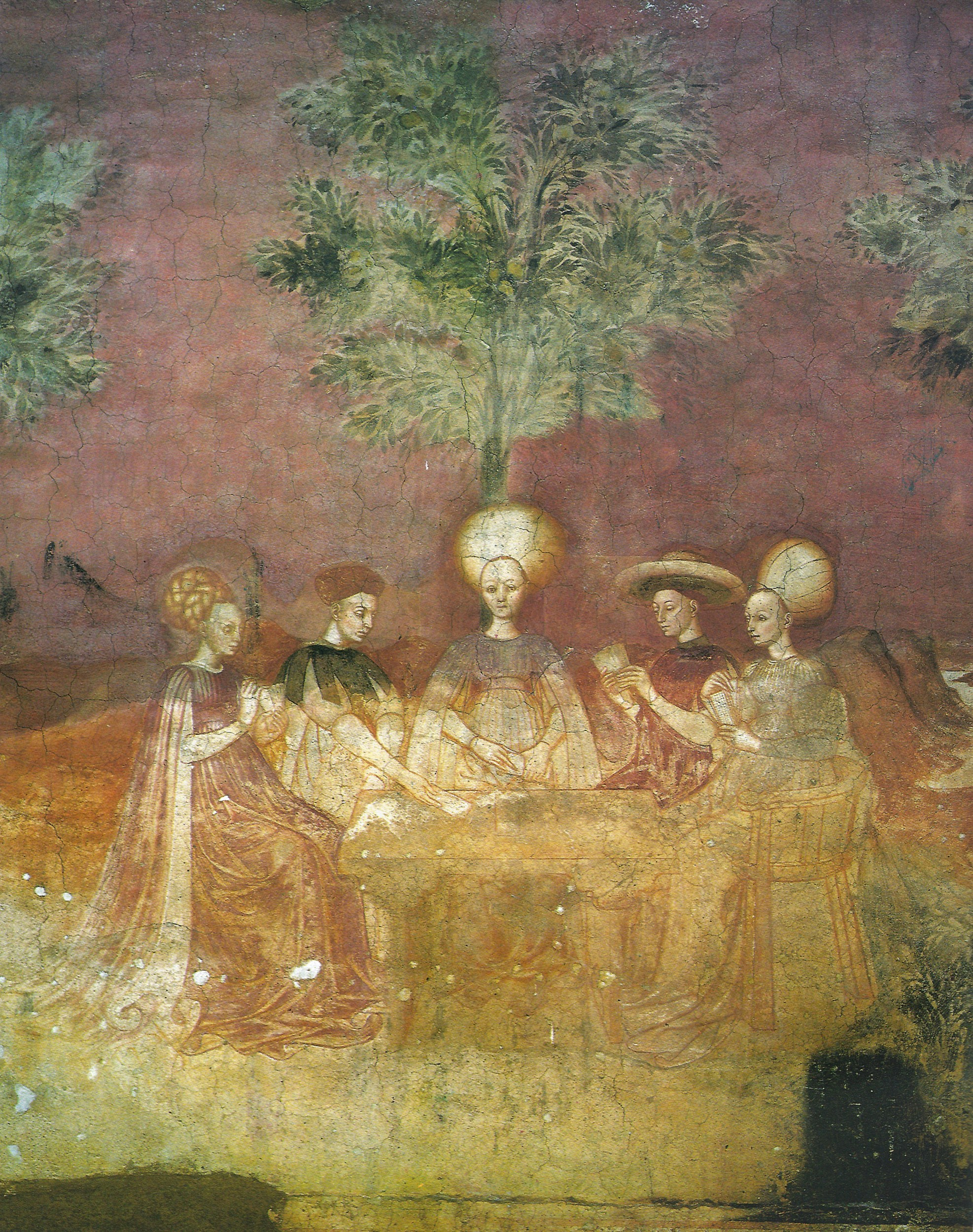
The Tarocchi Players, c.1440s, Palazzo Borromeo (Milan)

In 1959, Waite's Pictorial Key to the Tarot was republished with an introduction by Moakley. The reprint was prefaced with a quote from one of Waite's last books, The Holy Grail. It alluded to a relation between Tarot and the Holy Grail, and "certain secret records now existing in Europe...." It connects the suit-signs of Tarot to the so-called Grail Hallows, and thereby to Celtic lore. (Waite and Eliot both borrowed from Weston). (Note: Eliot: "Not only the title, but the plan and a good deal of the incidental symbolism of the poem were suggested by Miss Jessie L. Weston's book on the Grail legend: From Ritual to Romance (Macmillan). Indeed, so deeply am I indebted, Miss Weston's book will elucidate the difficulties of the poem much better than my notes can do, and I recommend it (apart from the great interest of the book itself) to any who think such elucidation of the poem worth the trouble.") Moakley repeatedly mentioned this common theme of 20th-century Tarot enthusiasts, including writers like Eliot as well as occultists and folklorists. This connection was later incorporated into works like Holy Blood, Holy Grail and The Da Vinci Code.

Moakley's introduction to The Pictorial Key provided some personal insight into Waite's character, his humor, mysticism, and scholarship. Moakley also foreshadowed the emphasis of later writers on the artist of the Waite-Smith deck, Pamela Colman Smith. Several pages of biographical information on Smith were included, indicating the importance of the illustrator to the final product. Moakley's writing reveals a fondness for and understanding of all her subjects, whether occultists like Encausse, scholars like Waite, or artists like Smith.

Her introduction closes with an expansion on the theme presented in Tarot of the Bohemians, concerning the value of such things as the Tarot. Moakley suggested that art, psychology, and mystic meditation can be valuable adjuncts to rational modern life. She wrote that Waite's Tarot may help "tease the imagination out of its old ruts". "By such a use of the Tarot the poisons of our cultural conditioning might be turned into healing balms, and a barrier into a gateway."

In The Pictorial Key, Moakley also contributed a section on the rules for playing the game of Tarot. This brief, 6-page summary of the game begins by describing a 15th-century fresco in the Palazzo Borromeo in Milan, Italy. The painting shows wealthy card players, the kind who enjoyed the gilded Tarot cards of the Visconti-Sforza style, playing the game. This, along with a description of the rules, constitutes a powerful reminder that the modern Tarot of Eliot and Waite is a very different thing from the historical Tarot of 15th-century Milan.

== Visconti-Sforza Tarot ==
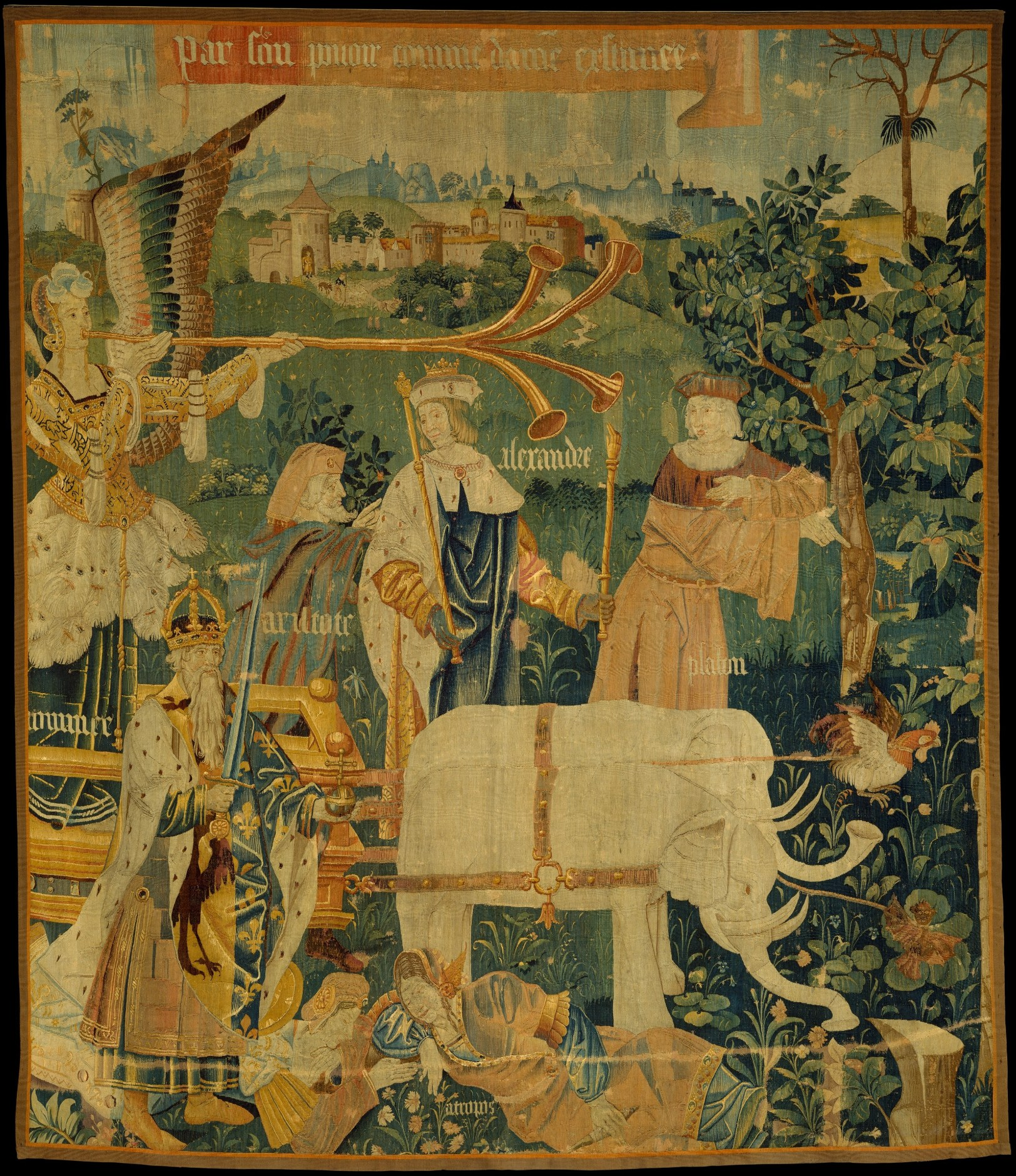
Petrarchian Triumph of Fame Tapestry at Metropolitan Museum; Flemish, 16th C.

One of the most significant insights Moakley contributed was her recognition that Tarot was primarily a card game, and that the game was called trionfi. Moakley had identified the original name of the Tarot as Trionfi, as in carte da trionfi. This was not conventional wisdom either then, in the 1950s, nor now. Understanding whether the artifact at hand is a deck of cards to play a card game, like many others, or an occult manifesto-like, or a fortune-telling device like a Ouija board.

Moakley studied a particular historical Tarot deck, usually known as the Visconti-Sforza deck. (Note: The Visconti-Sforza deck is also known as the Pierpont Morgan-Bergamo deck. The surviving cards are divided between the Pierpont Morgan Library in New York, the Accademia Carrara in Bergamo, and a private collection.) Moakley's book correctly identified the provenance of the Visconti-Sforza deck, the family for which it was created, and reported on them in some detail. In addition, she investigated the life and work of the Cremonese painter, Bonifacio Bembo, and his relationship with the Visconti-Sforza family. Six replacement cards were painted by a different hand, decades after the deck was originally created. These have been attributed to various artists, including Bembo's brother Benedetto.)

In addition to being a richly painted and gilded artifact, the Visconti-Sforza deck is one of the earliest surviving Tarot decks, probably made within a decade of the game's invention, and one of the most complete decks from the first half-century of Tarot. Numerous other luxury decks appear to have been modeled on the same pattern, probably from a workshop in Cremona. (Note: A number of later copies are known. In addition, Bianca Maria Visconti sent a letter dated 1452, approximately the time of the Visconti-Sforza deck, to her husband Francesco Sforza, relaying a request from Sigismondo Malatesta, Lord of Rimini, for a deck of Tarot cards of the kind made in Cremona. Pizzagalli, 1988, translated at http://www.trionfi.com/0/e/r71/08.html.) The design of the Visconti-Sforza is characteristic of the large majority of all later Tarot decks. Moakley's book included B&W reproductions of all 74 cards, and identified the subject matter of all surviving trump cards, using period-appropriate names from 15th-century sources. She also correctly identified the suit signs as typical of early Italian decks, being Cups, Coins, Swords, and Staves.

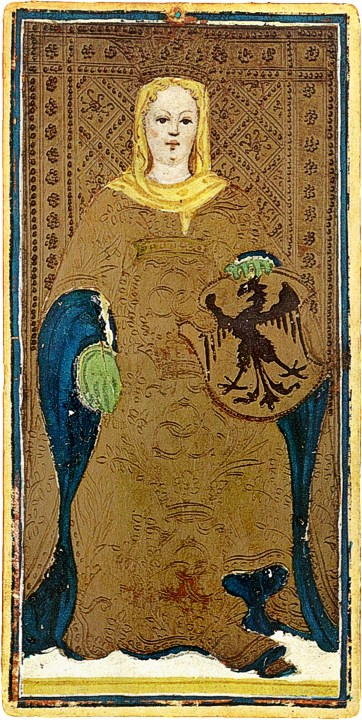
The Visconti-Sforza Empress card, showing the Borromean Rings motif.

== Reception ==
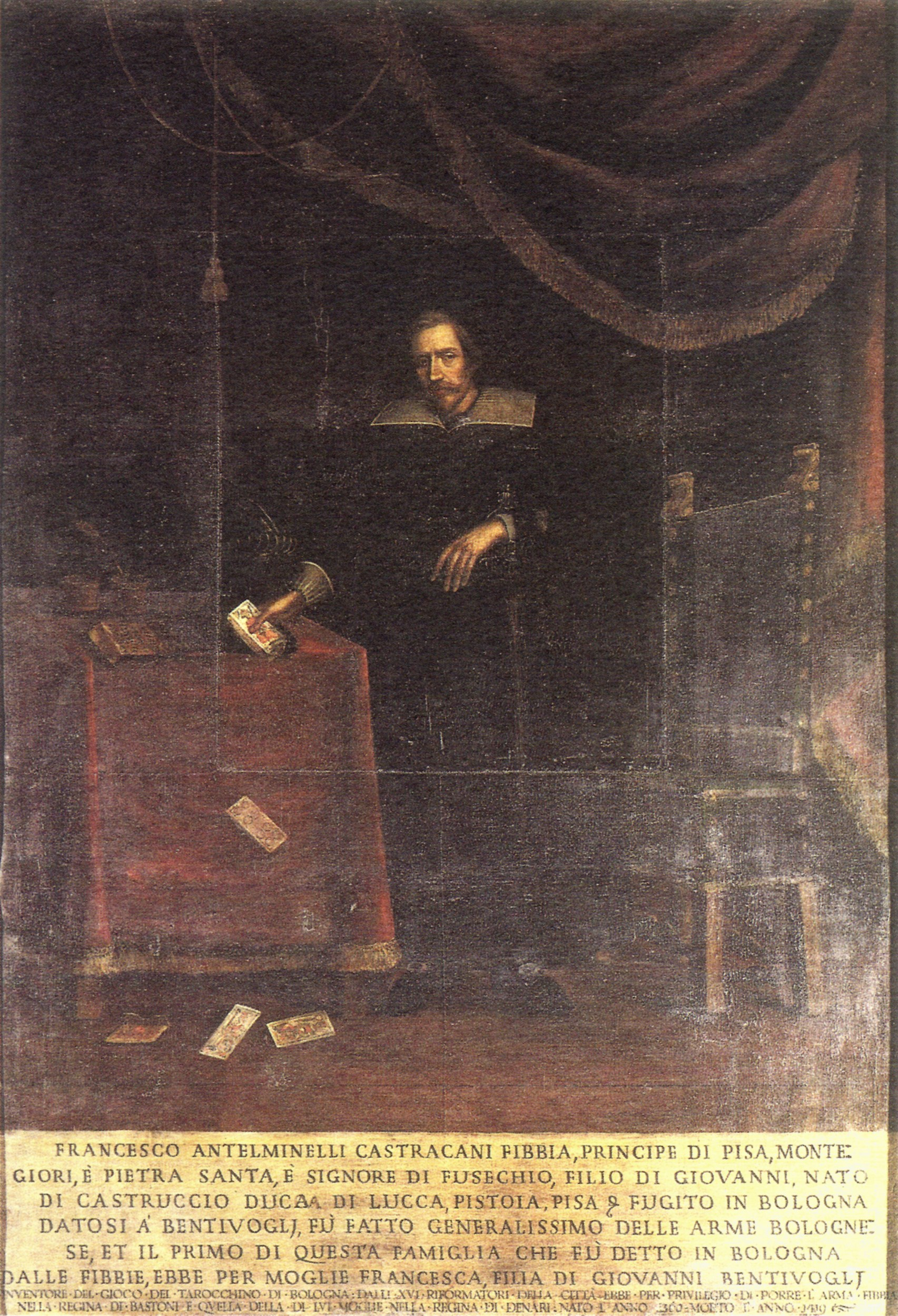
Prince Castracani Fibbia (1360–1419) with Tarot cards. The Queen of Batons bears the Fibbia arms.

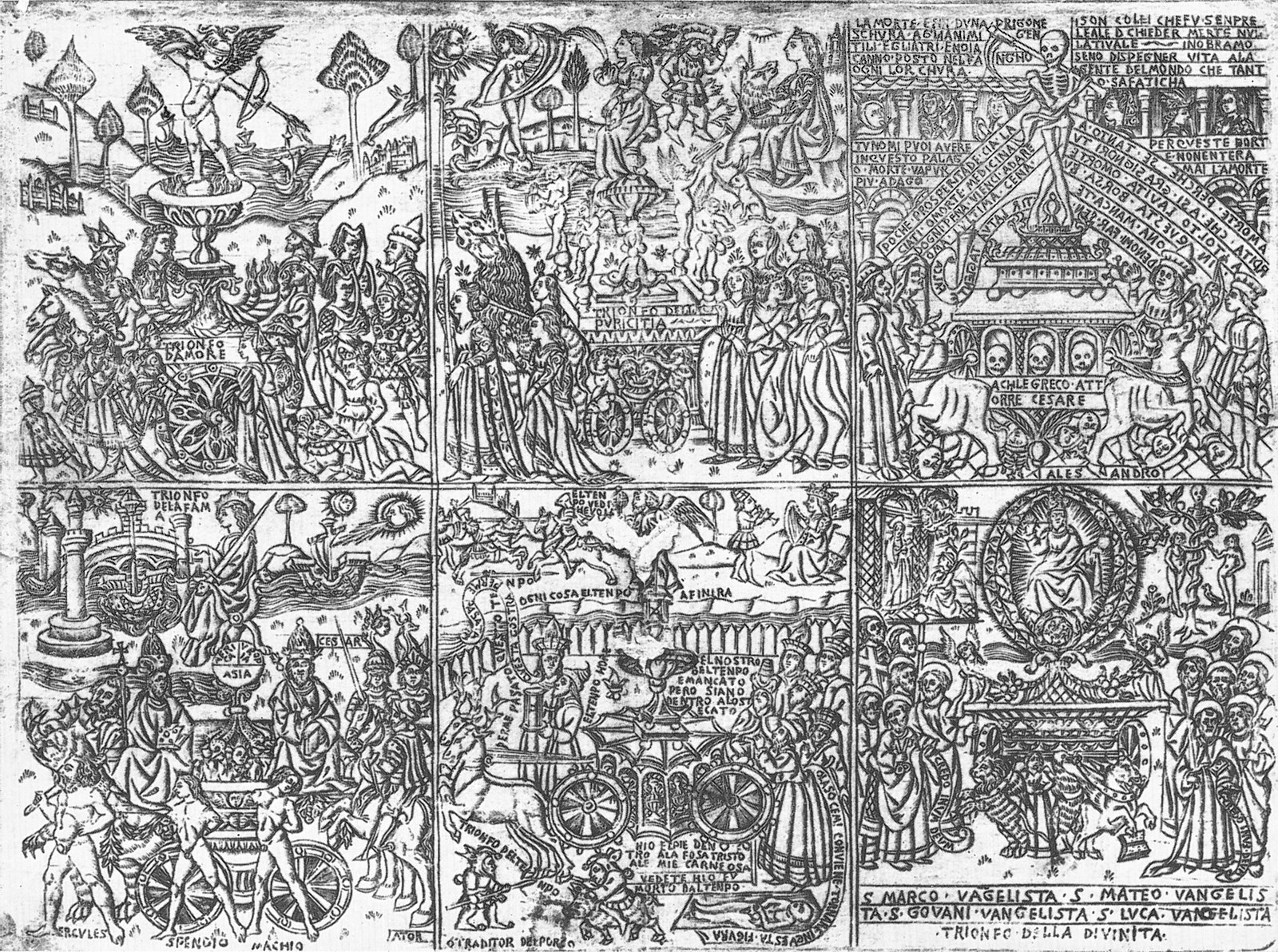
The six Triumphs of Petrarch; Florentine woodcut, 15th C.

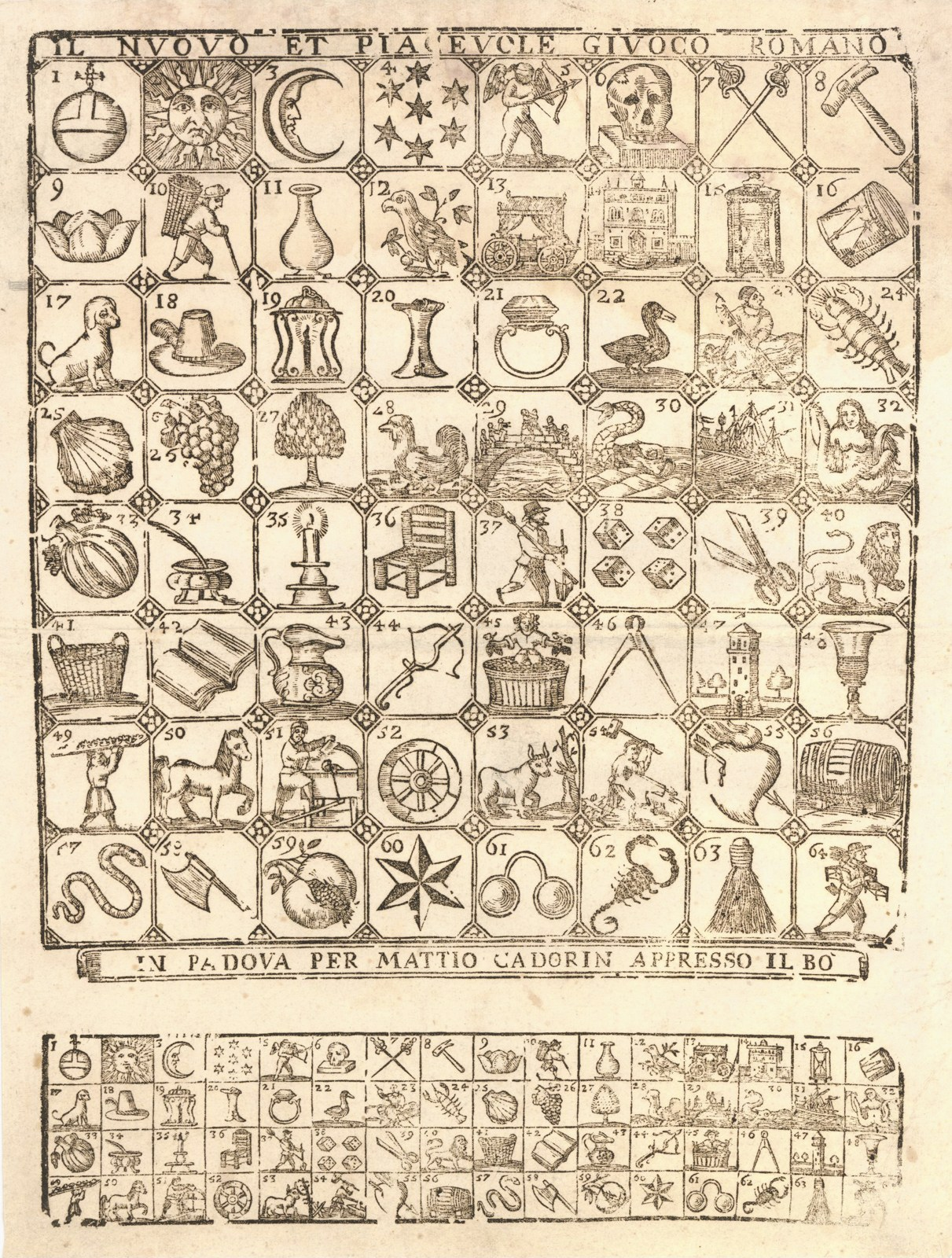
Il Nuovo et Piacevole Giuoco Romano, a 17th C. board game of the Biribissi type, from Padua.

Some aspects of Moakley's understanding of the Tarot have proven perfectly sound. Unlike most writers before and since she approached the Tarot as a card game from 15th-century Italy rather than an esoteric manifesto of mysterious origin and transmission. In 1980, Michael Dummett's comprehensive study of Tarot history, The Game of Tarot, confirmed and documented in great detail the correctness of those conclusions. Likewise, the art-historical approach to understanding the subject matter on the cards has proven more productive than occult impositions. This approach included focusing on a specific, very early deck of identifiable provenance, (Note: Some details remain uncertain, even with regard to this famous and well-studied deck, but its authorship and provenance are better established than most decks or standard patterns of playing cards.) which enabled the identification of numerous specific Visconti and Sforza emblems on the cards.

A significant part of Moakley's interpretation involved the suit signs being related to the allegory of the trumps. This has generally been ignored. The Latin suit-signs as emblems of the virtues echoes a 16th-century Bolognese allegorization of the suits by Innocentio Ringhieri, and is one of many allegorical readings of suit-signs over the centuries. However, the idea that the suit cards represented allegorical companies in a pageant intended to accompany the trump cards is simply false: The suit cards were standard for many decades prior to the invention of Tarot's trump cards and were directly adopted from 14th-century Arabic playing cards. Her interpretation of the trump cards, however, has been influential. Even popular Tarot books routinely mention something about Moakley and Petrarch.

While Moakley's general thesis, that the trump cards were called carte da trioni because they formed an allegorical hierarchy of triumphs, has received support, (Note: Moakley is poorly regarded or ignored by most fortune-tellers, mystics, New Age writers, and other pop-culture Tarot enthusiasts.) her explanation of the specifics of the Tarot trump cycle is less well received. Robert V. O'Neill summarized the problem most directly.

"The explanation is that the Tarot is not only a simplification of Petrarch's scheme but also a spoof, a ribald take-off on the solemnity of the original story in the spirit of the Carnival parade. This explanation is not acceptable simply because it allows too much freedom. Any lack of correspondence can be passed off as part of the joke. Therefore, if the cards match it is taken as positive evidence for the theory, while any discrepancy is dismissed offhand. This is too simplistic."

That criticism, that Moakley's interpretation is an ad hoc gloss rather than an explanatory analysis, is given a broader application by Dummett.

== Alternative interpretations ==
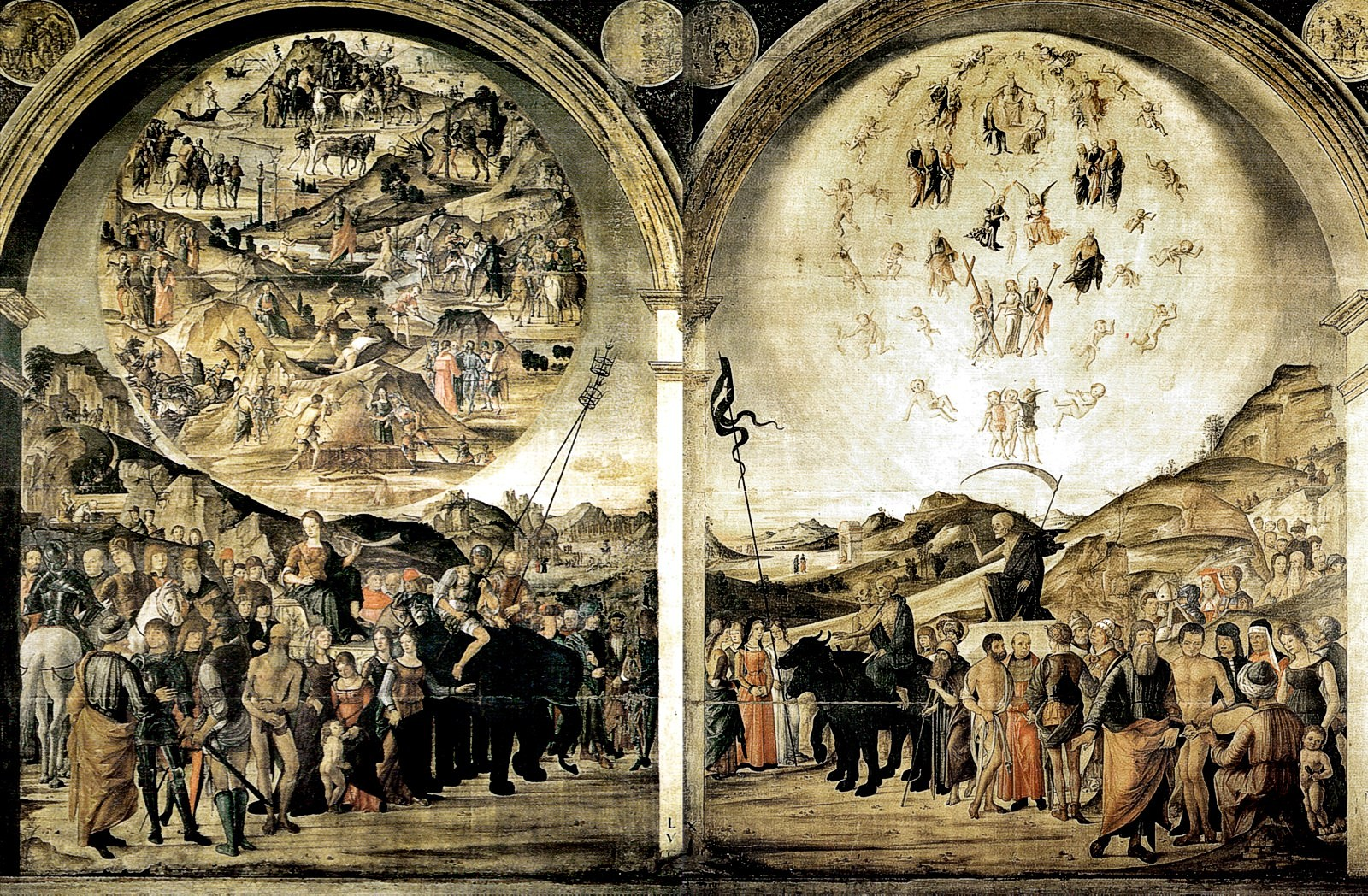
Petrarchian allegory showing triumphs of Fame and Death, Bentivoglio Chapel, Bologna, late 1480s.

In the 16th century, there were two Italian authors who wrote essays on the meaning of Tarot. Both presented the trump cycle as a moral allegory rather than an esoteric manifesto, secret codebook, rituals of initiation, fortune-telling device, representation of some precursor work of art or literature, or one of the various other genres to which the trumps have been assigned by occultists and 20th-century writers. In the 19th century there were some writers who suggested that the meaning of the Tarot trump cards was most closely related to the Dance of Death works of pre-modern art. This is closely related to the moral allegories suggested by the two Renaissance writers. Both approaches to the trumps are similar to Moakley's, given that Petrarch's Trionfi is itself a moral allegory centered around the triumph of Death, and that other variations on Petrarch's were popular artistic themes in cassoni and birth trays.

In the 18th and 19th centuries, the occult Tarot was invented. Writers with little knowledge of or interest in the historical facts of the Tarot simply made up stories. In the 20th century, countless fortune-tellers, occultists, and New Age writers have offered variations on the themes of 18th- and 19th-century occultists. In addition, a number of new themes were suggested in Alfred Douglas' 1972 book, speculations which continue to inspire esotericists today. One theme that is worth mentioning is the Fool's Journey. This was established and promoted in the 1960s and 1970s by Eden Gray, and has become a cornerstone of modern, esoteric Tarot interpretations. Perhaps the most notable advocate of this interpretation was Theodore Roszak, a prominent social critic and author of The Making of a Counter Culture (1969). His 1988 booklet, Fool's Cycle/Full Cycle: Reflections on the Great Trumps of the Tarot, presents a fairly standard example of the interpretation.

William Marston Seabury and Joseph Campbell suggested a different approach; they both asserted that the Tarot trump cards had some connection with Dante Alighieri's masterpiece, Divine Comedy. John Shephard attempted to explain the trumps and their sequence by reference to a medieval astrological concept known as Children of the Planets. Timothy Betts attempted to explain the trumps as a representation of medieval Christian legends about the Last Emperor and eschatological events. The vast majority of 20th-century interpretations explicitly appeal to would-be mystics, fortune-tellers, and enthusiasts whose primary interest in Tarot history and iconography is validation of New Age folklore and esoteric practices. The fact that Moakley's writings were intended to reach a broader audience, and to address more objective historical questions, distinguishes them.

== Publications ==
=== Books and articles ===
- Moakley, Gertrude (1954). "The Waite-Smith Tarot: A Footnote to The Waste Land". Bulletin of the New York Public Library. 58: 471–475.
- Moakley, Gertrude (1956). "The Tarot Trumps and Petrarch's Trionfi: Some Suggestions on their Relationship". Bulletin of the New York Public Library. 60: 55–69.
- Moakley, Gertrude (1957). Basic Filing Rules for Medium-sized Libraries: a Compend Filing Code for Catalogs of 120 to 2000 Trays. Rudolf Flesch (forward). William-Frederick Press.
- Moakley, Gertrude (1966). The Tarot Cards Painted by Bonifacio Bembo for the Visconti-Sforza Family: An Iconographic and Historical Study. New York Public Library.

=== Contributions ===
- Moakley, Gertrude (1958). Introduction. The Tarot of the Bohemians: Absolute Key to Occult Science. By Papus. Translated by Waite, A.E. Arcanum Books.
- Waite, Arthur Edward; Moakley, Gertrude (1959). "Introduction, and Note on the Tarot as a Game". The Pictorial Key to the Tarot: Being Fragments of a Secret Tradition under the Veil of Divination. University Books.

== See also ==
- Fortune telling
- Occultism
- Tarot card reading
- Trionfi (cards)
