= Brunate =

Brunate Brunaa (Lombard)
- Comune
- Comune di Brunate
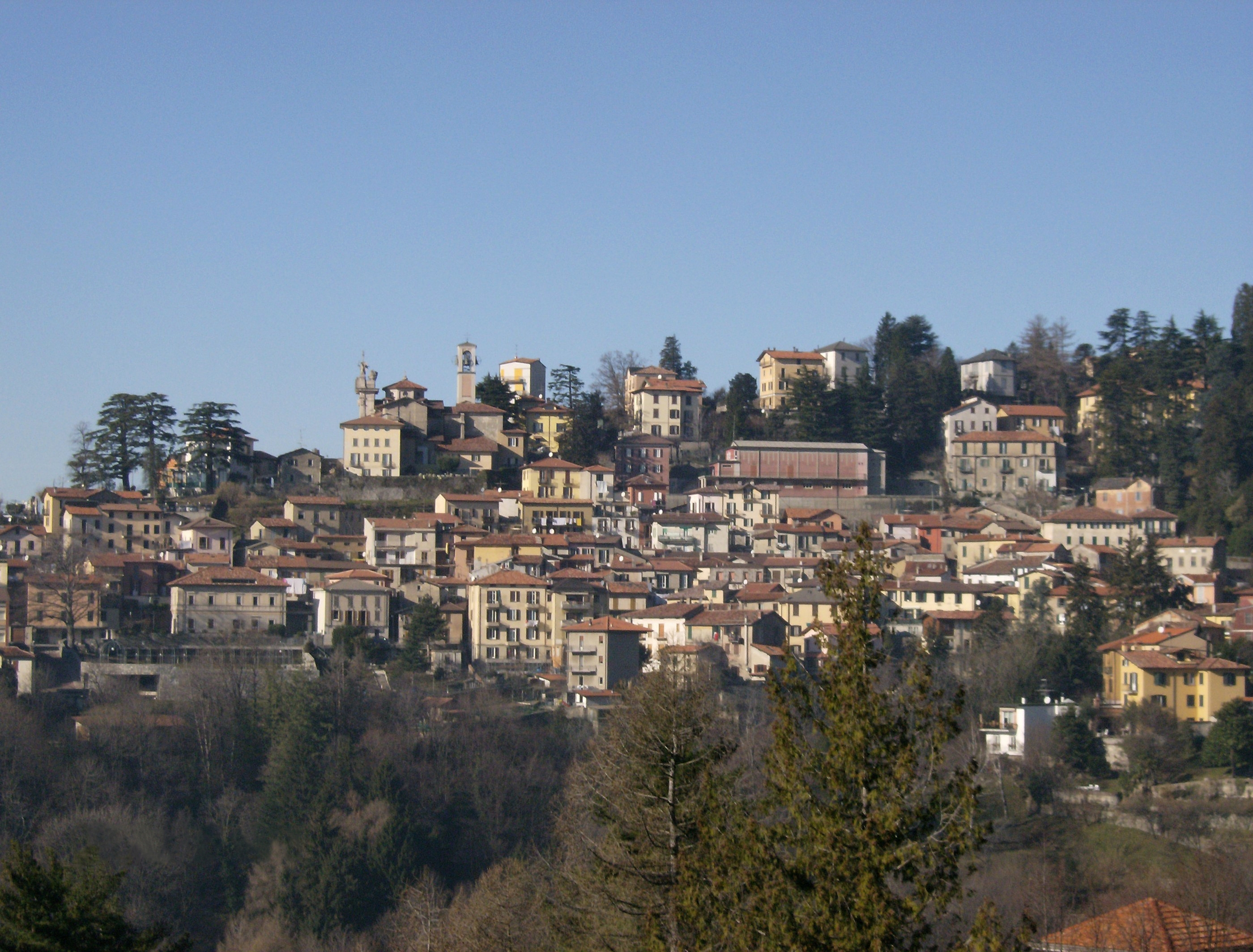
- View of Brunate

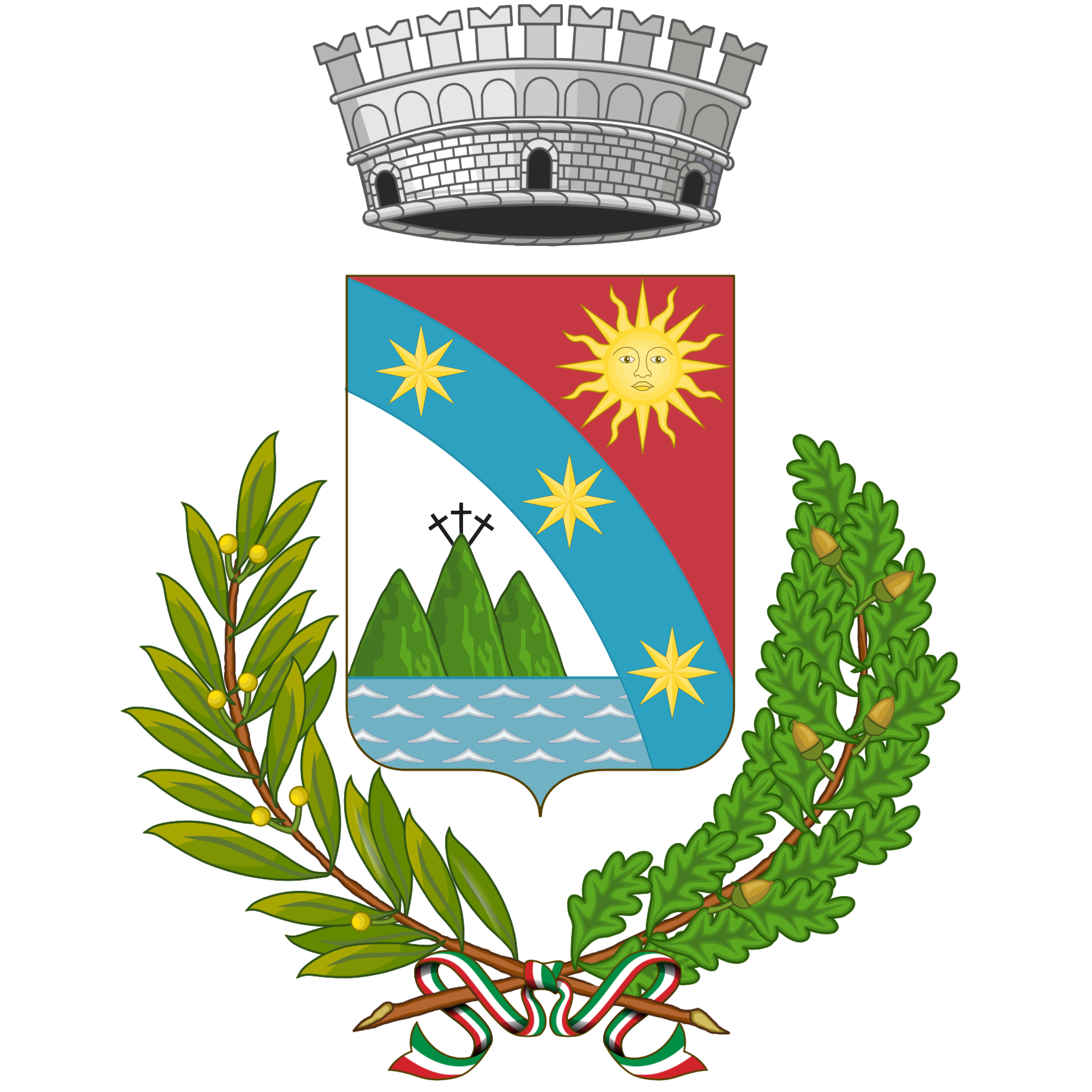
- Coat of arms

- Location within Italy Location within Lombardy
- Coordinates: 45°49′N 9°6′E
- Country: Italy
- Region: Lombardy
- Province: Province of Como (CO)
- Frazioni: Cao, Carescione, Laghetto, Nidrino, Piani di Brunate, San Maurizio

Government
  - Mayor: Davide Bodini

Area
  - Total: 1.96 km^{2} (0.76 sq mi)
- Elevation: 715 m (2,346 ft)

Population (2001)
  - Total: 1,730
  - Density: 883/km^{2} (2,290/sq mi)
- Demonym: Brunatesi
- Time zone: UTC+1 (CET)
  - Summer (DST): UTC+2 (CEST)
- Postal code: 22034
- Dialing code: 031
- Patron saint: Saint Andrew the Apostle
- Saint day: 30 November
- Website: Official website

Brunate (Comasco: Brunaa [bryˈnaː]) is a town and comune in the province of Como in northern Italy, some 50 kilometres (31 mi) northeast of Milan. It has some 1,800 residents, but is much more populated in summer, when tourists rent houses and apartments.

The town overlooks Como, which lies on the shore of Lake Como some 500 metres (1,600 ft) below. For a short time in the late 12th century Brunate was an independent commune, but in 1240 it reverted to the suzerainty of Como.

Como and Brunate are linked by a steep, narrow, winding road, and by the Como to Brunate funicular.

Alessandro Volta lived in Brunate for a short period – the Faro Voltiano lighthouse in the San Maurizio district, was built and named in his honour. The Bulgarian poet Pencho Slaveykov died in the town on 10 June 1912.

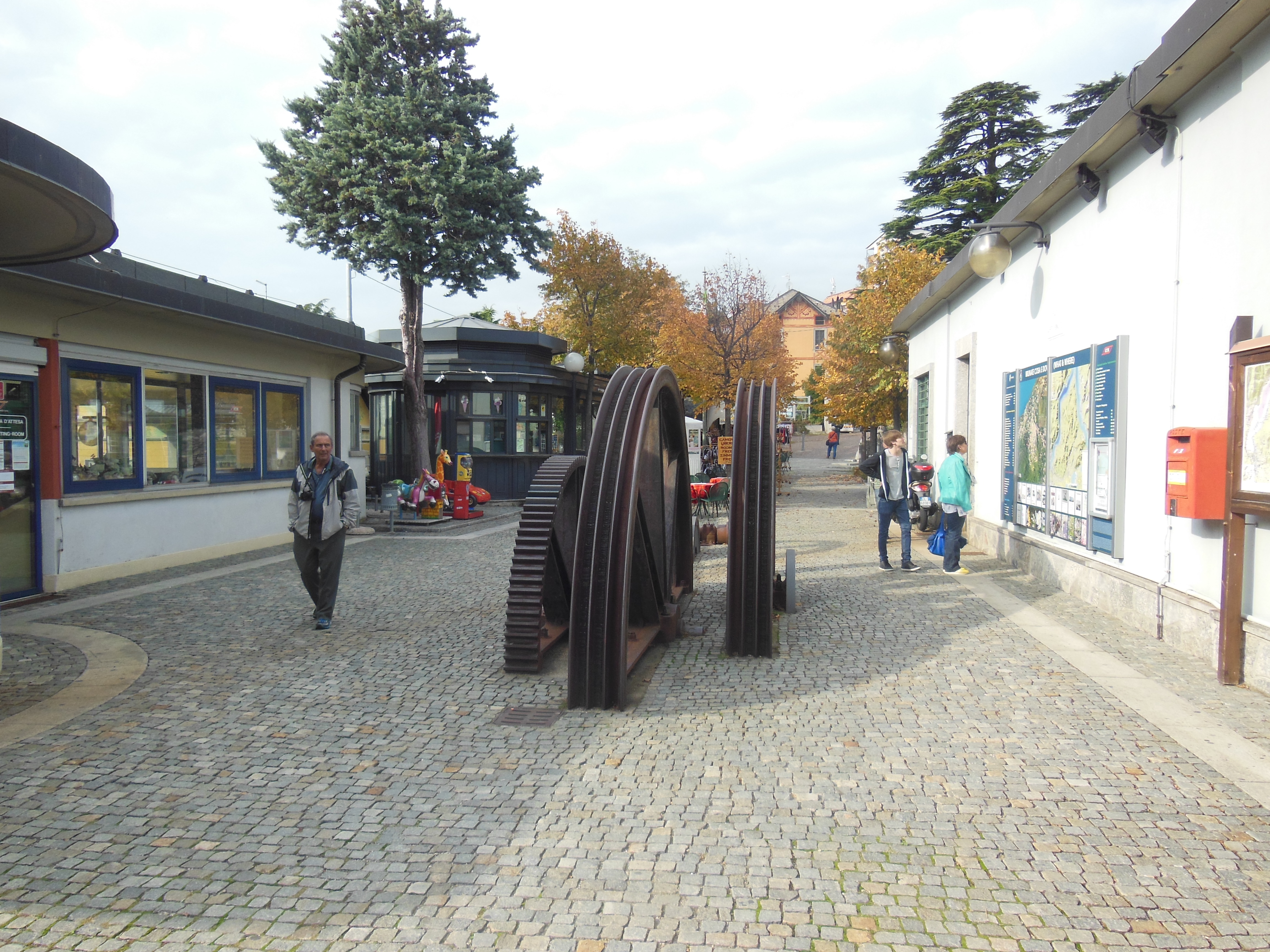
Brunate, by the funicular station

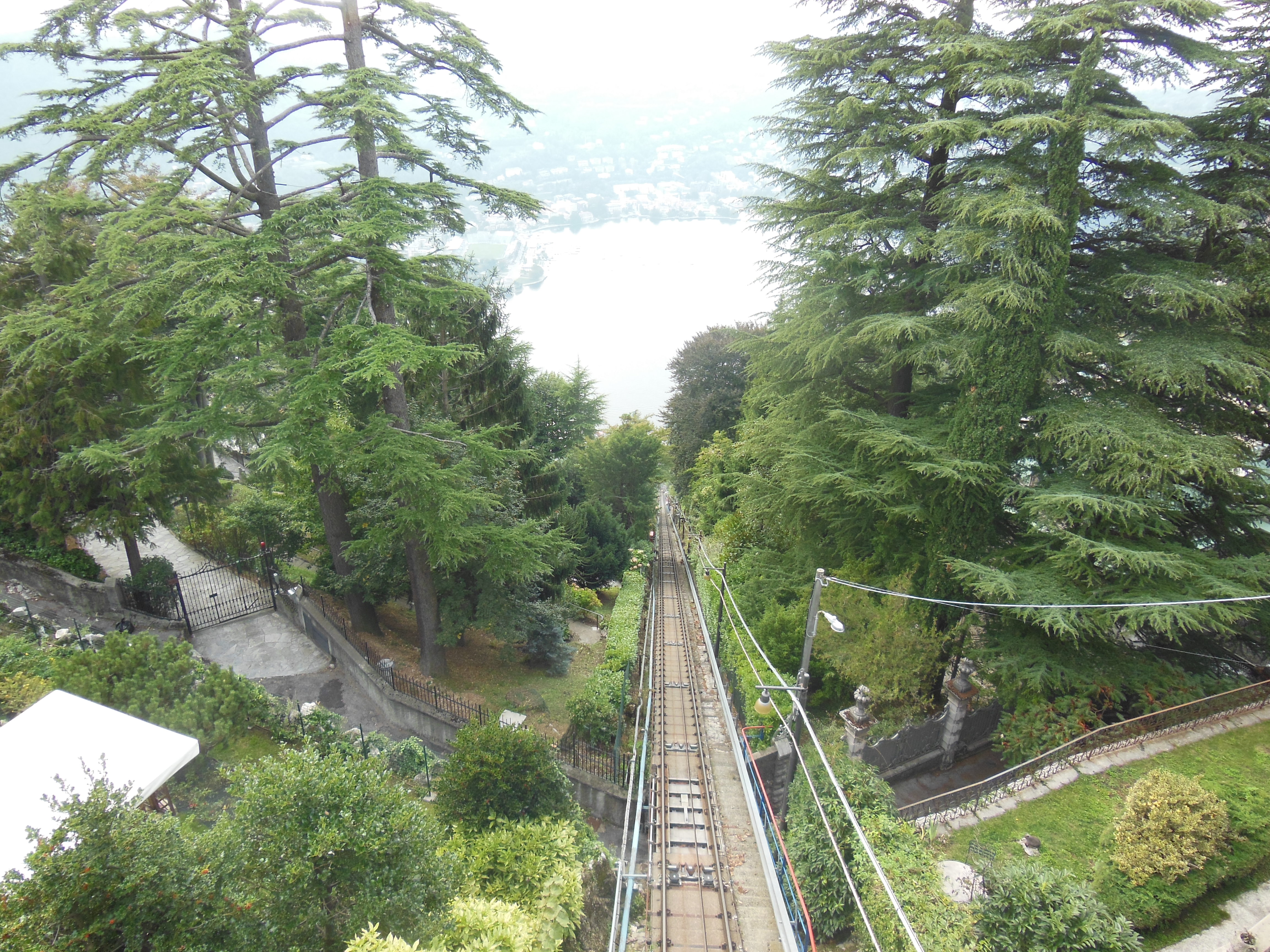
Brunate, looking down the funicular to Lake Como

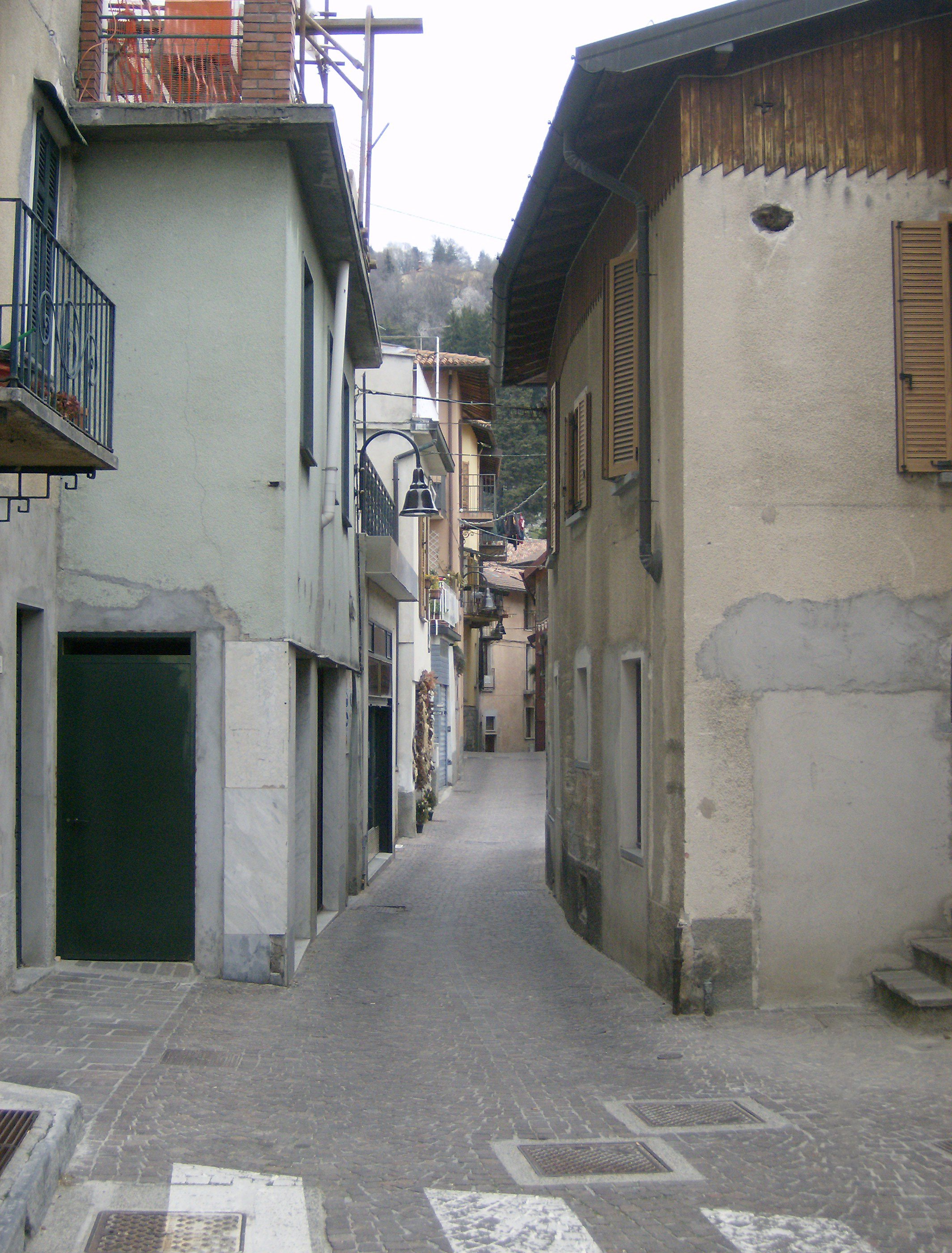
Brunate, Via P. e M. Monti

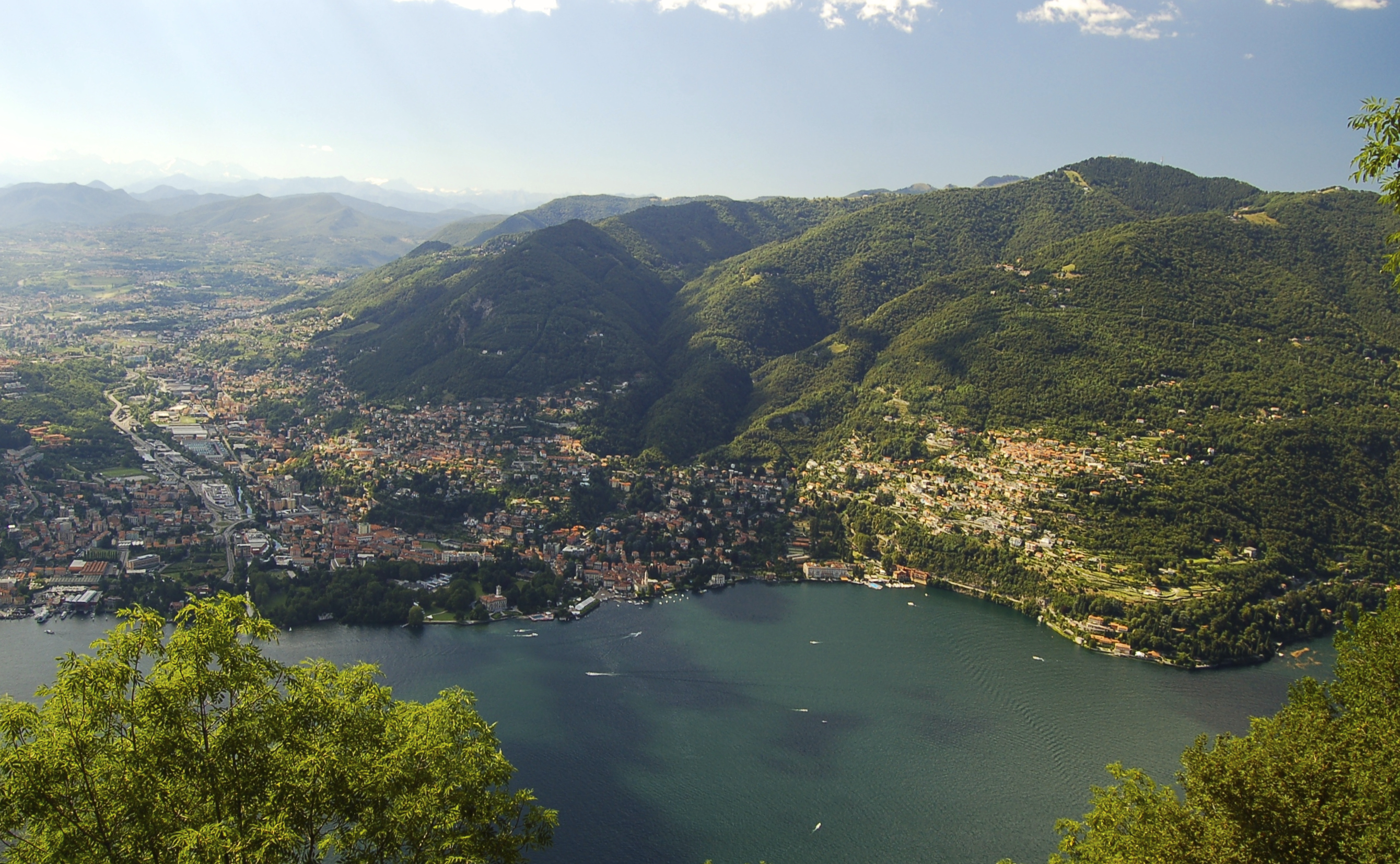
View of Cernobbio and Lake Como from Brunate
