= Oswald Wirth Tarot =

19th century tarot deck by Oswald Wirth

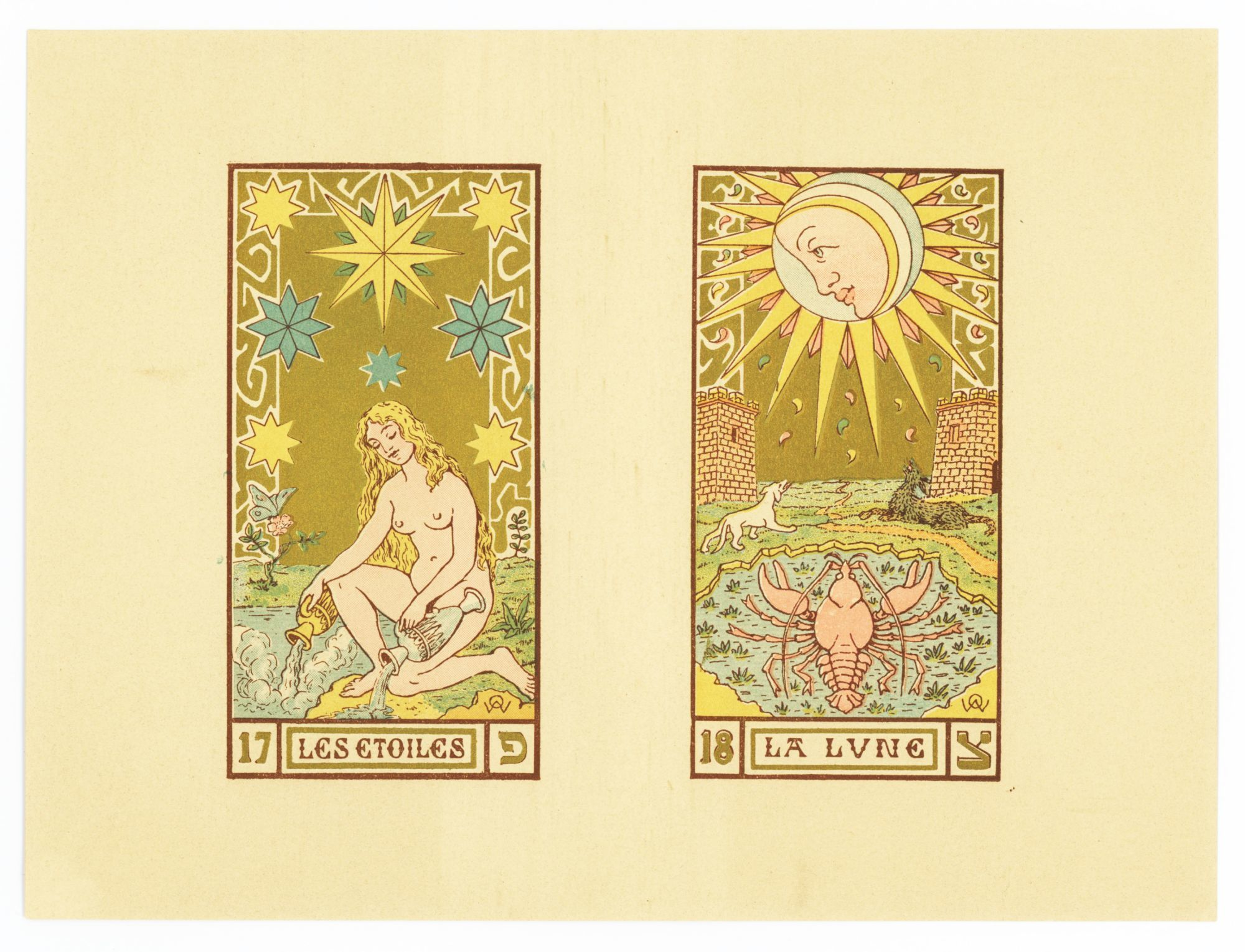
Plate from the Oswald Wirth Tarot, featuring the cards The Star (Les Étoiles) and The Moon (La Lune).

The Oswald Wirth Tarot, is an esoteric tarot deck designed at the end of the 19th century by the Swiss occultist Oswald Wirth. It is a symbolic reinterpretation of the 22 Major Arcana of the Tarot of Marseilles, incorporating elements of Kabbalah, alchemy, and the Hermetic tradition.

== History ==
The Wirth Tarot is a historic esoteric tarot deck created by the Swiss occultist, Kabbalist, and Freemason Oswald Wirth (1860–1943) in 1889, under the influence and commission of Stanislas de Guaita, a French poet and esotericist. Wirth designed the twenty-two Major Arcana based on the Tarot of Marseilles, but incorporating Kabbalistic and alchemical symbols, as well as the teachings of the esotericist Éliphas Lévi. Unlike older decks, the Wirth Tarot includes the corresponding Hebrew letters on each Major Arcana, along with titles in French, and deliberately uses color to give them an esoteric context. Although it is not the most widespread deck, it is probably the most rigorous from an esoteric and symbolic point of view.

Wirth only created the trumps (Major Arcana), which circulated in limited editions and were hand-colored. He did not draw the Minor Arcana. In 1926, he produced a second revised version of the Major Arcana, and in 1927 he published his main work, Le Tarot des imagiers du Moyen Âge (known in Spanish as El tarot de los imagineros de la Edad Media), in which he delves deeply into the symbolism and initiatory value of the tarot. Modern complete editions of 78 cards (with added Minor Arcana) are based on his original designs and usually feature the Major Arcana with a golden background and vibrant colors. This tarot was one of the first to serve as a tool for symbolic knowledge and initiation, functioning more as a “spiritual map” than as a tool for divination.

== Gallery ==
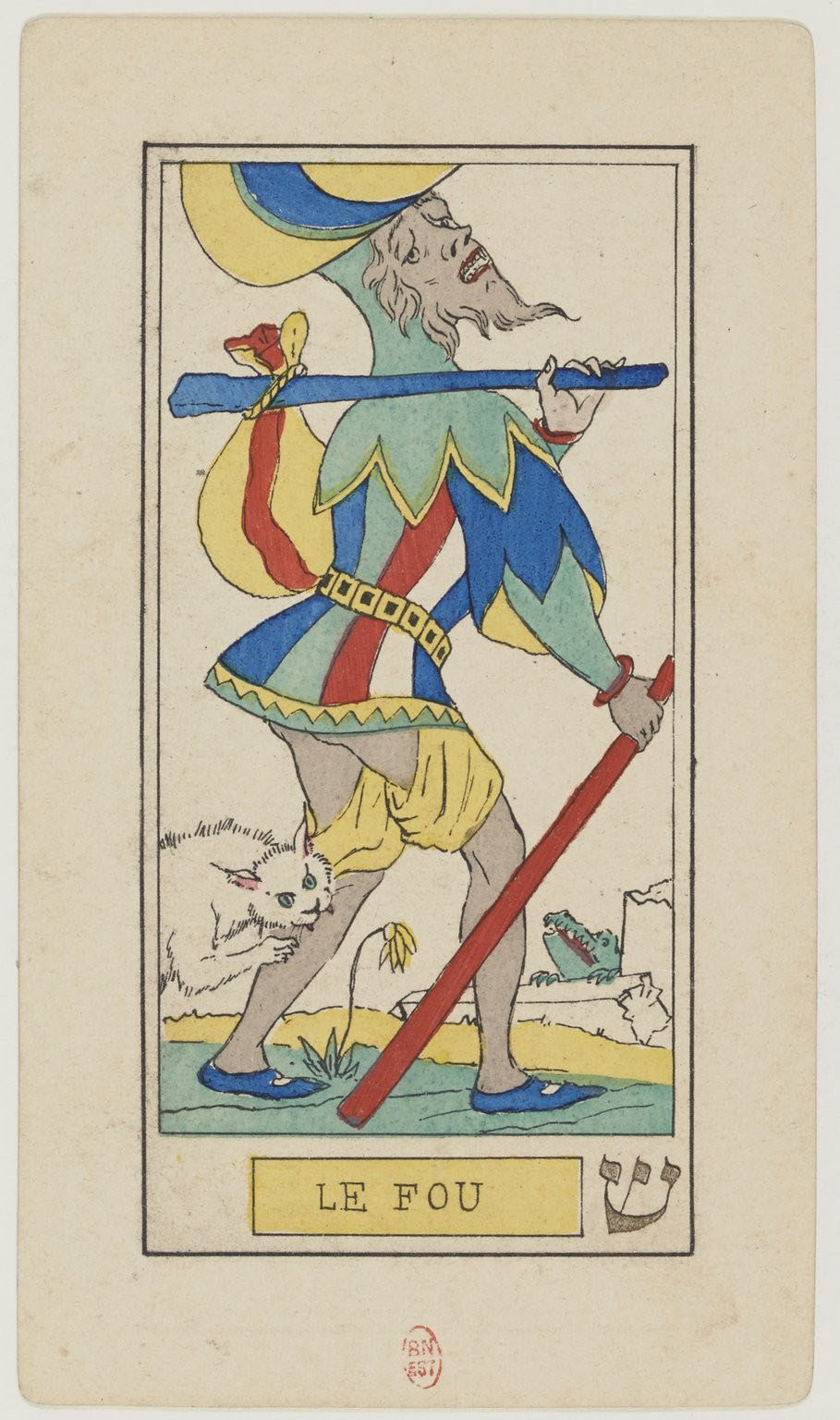
0. Le Fou
The Fool

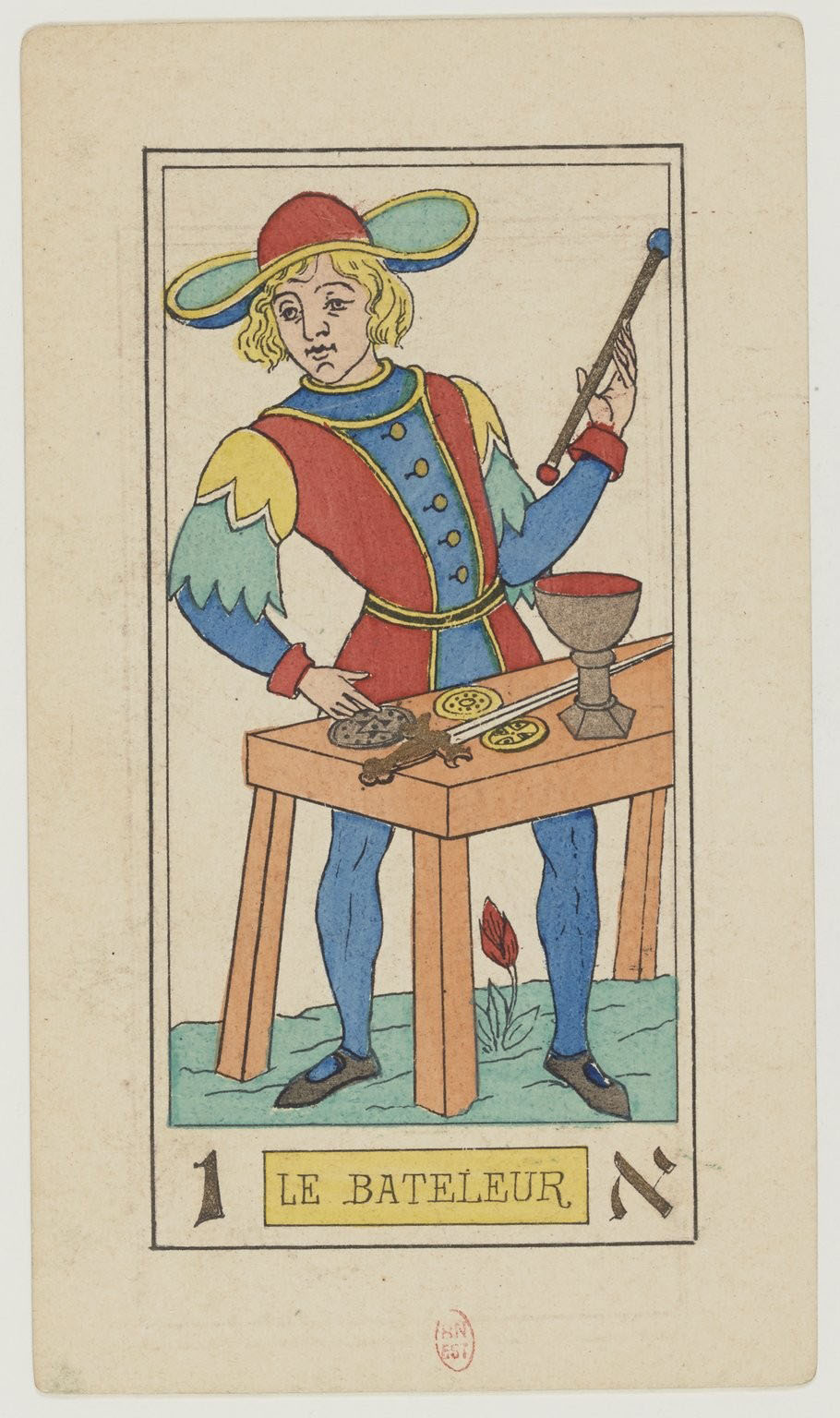
I. Le Bateleur
The Magician

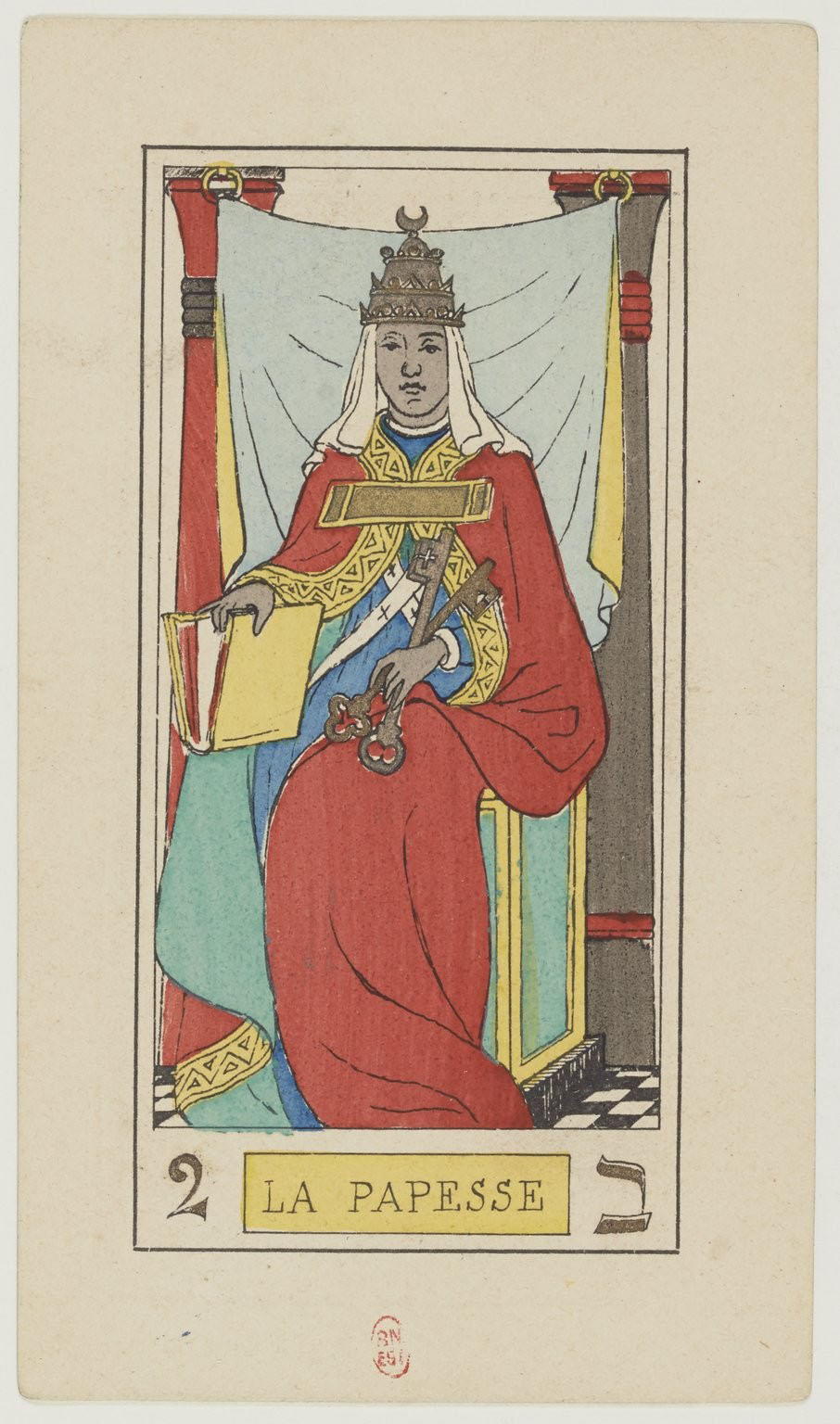
II. La Papesse
The Priestess

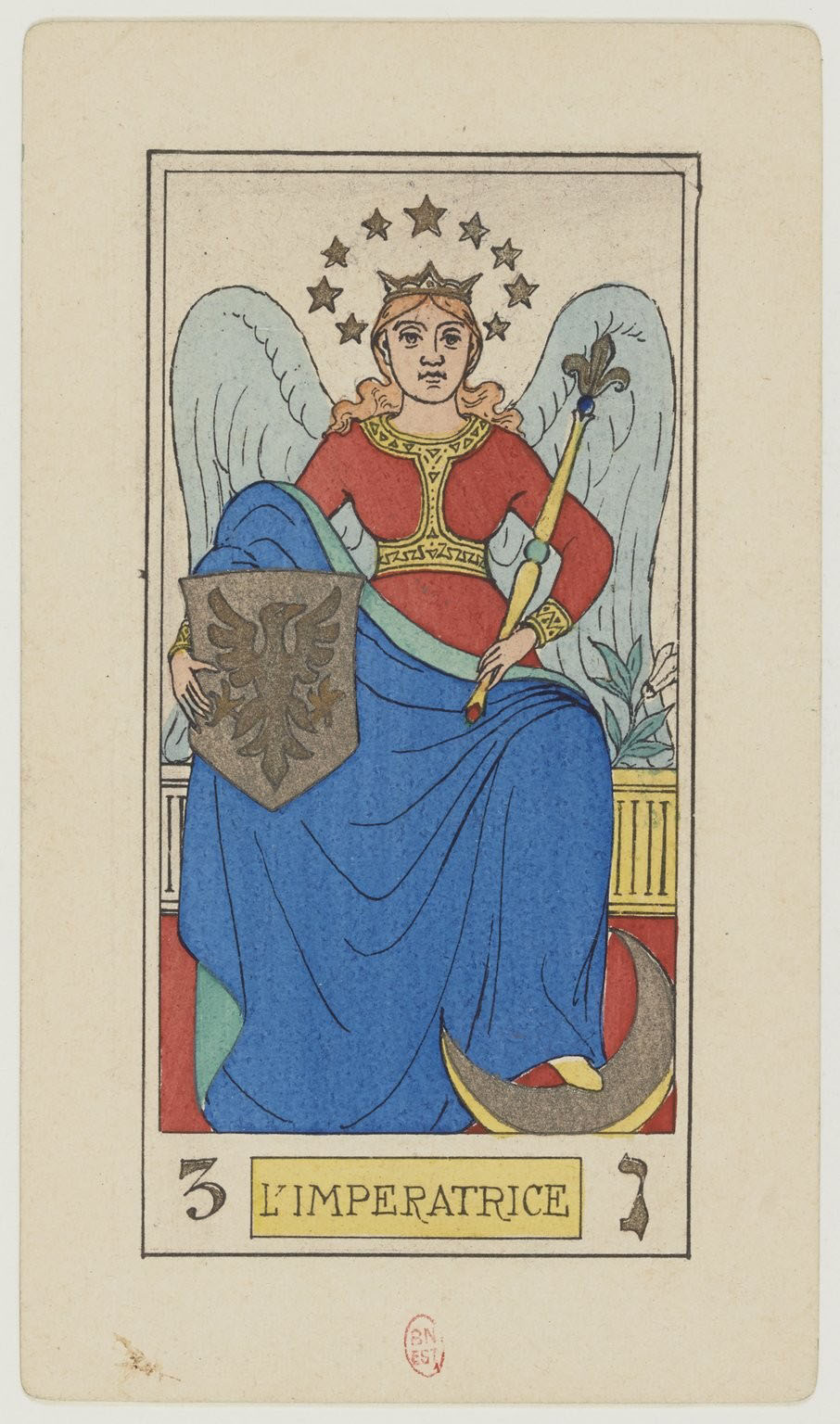
III.L'Imperatrice
The Empress

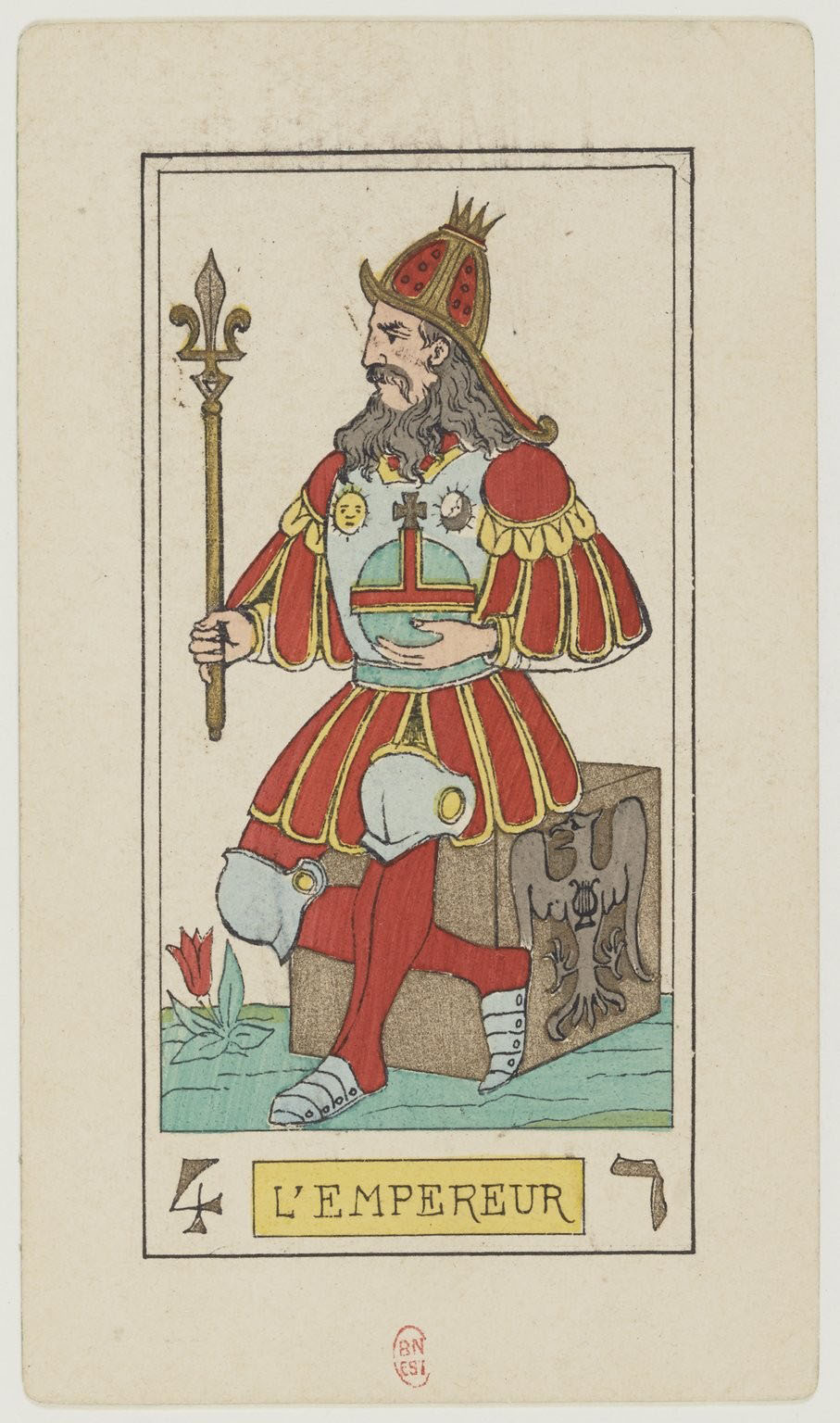
IIII. L'Empereur
The Emperor

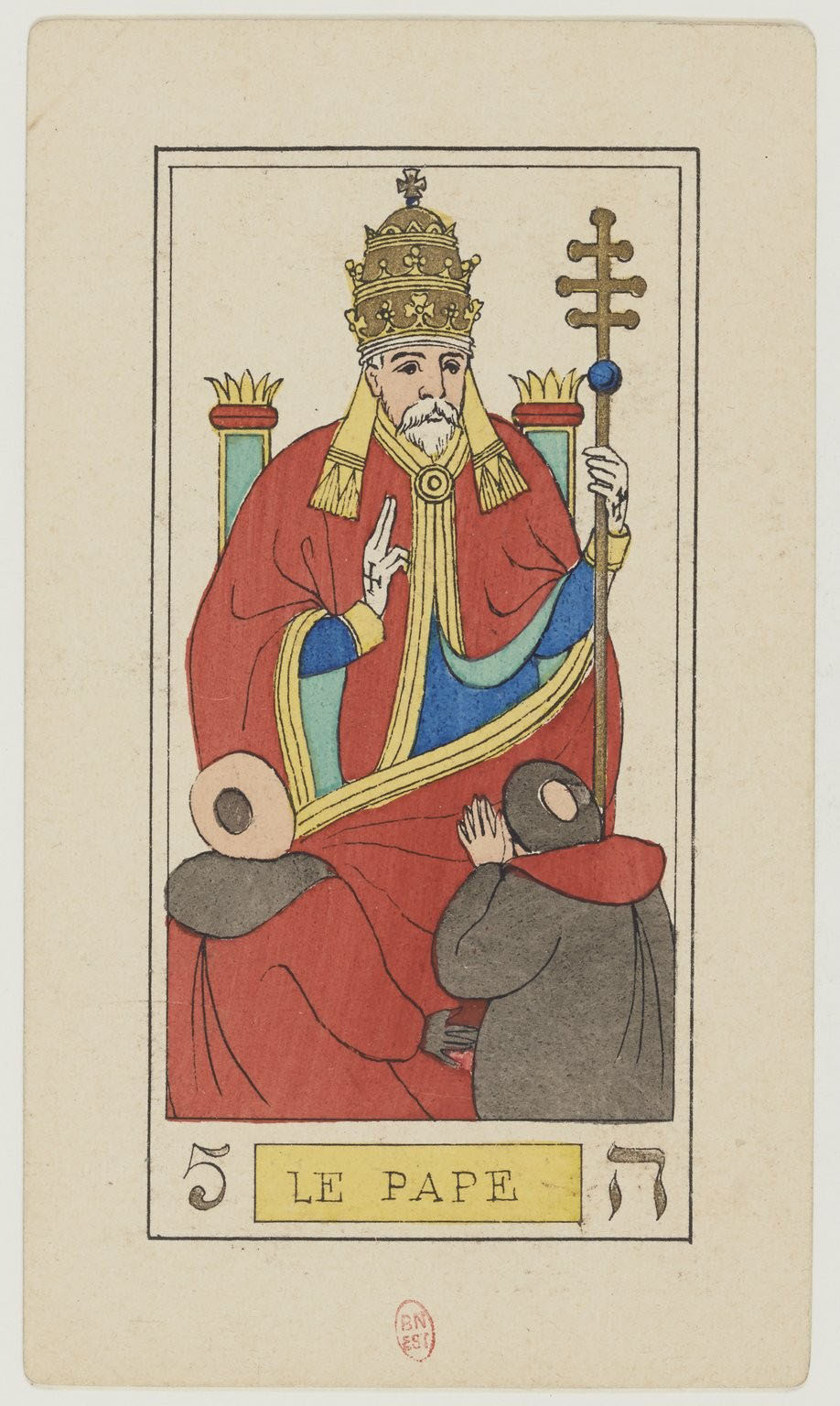
V. Le Pape
The Hierophant

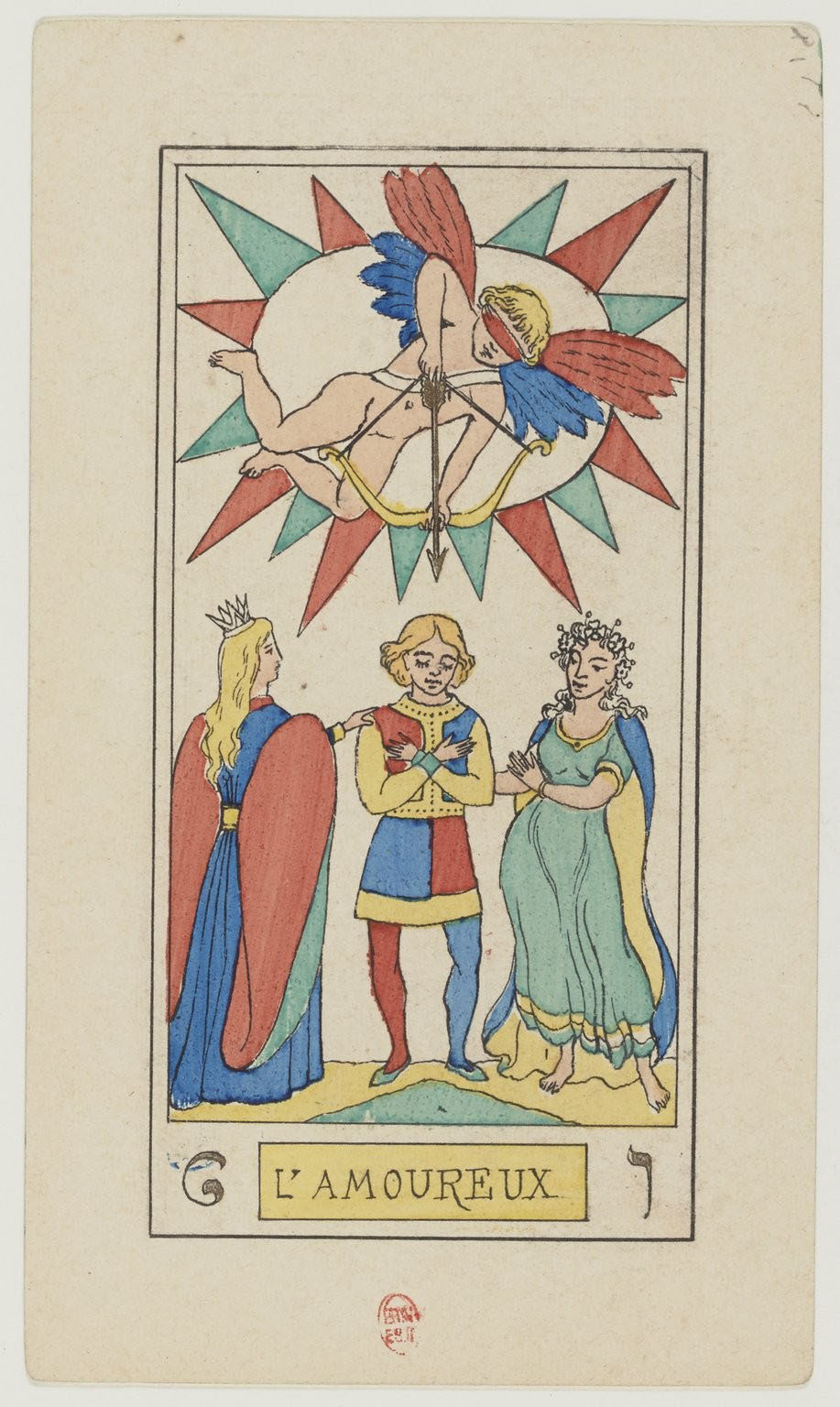
VI. L'Amoureux
The Lovers

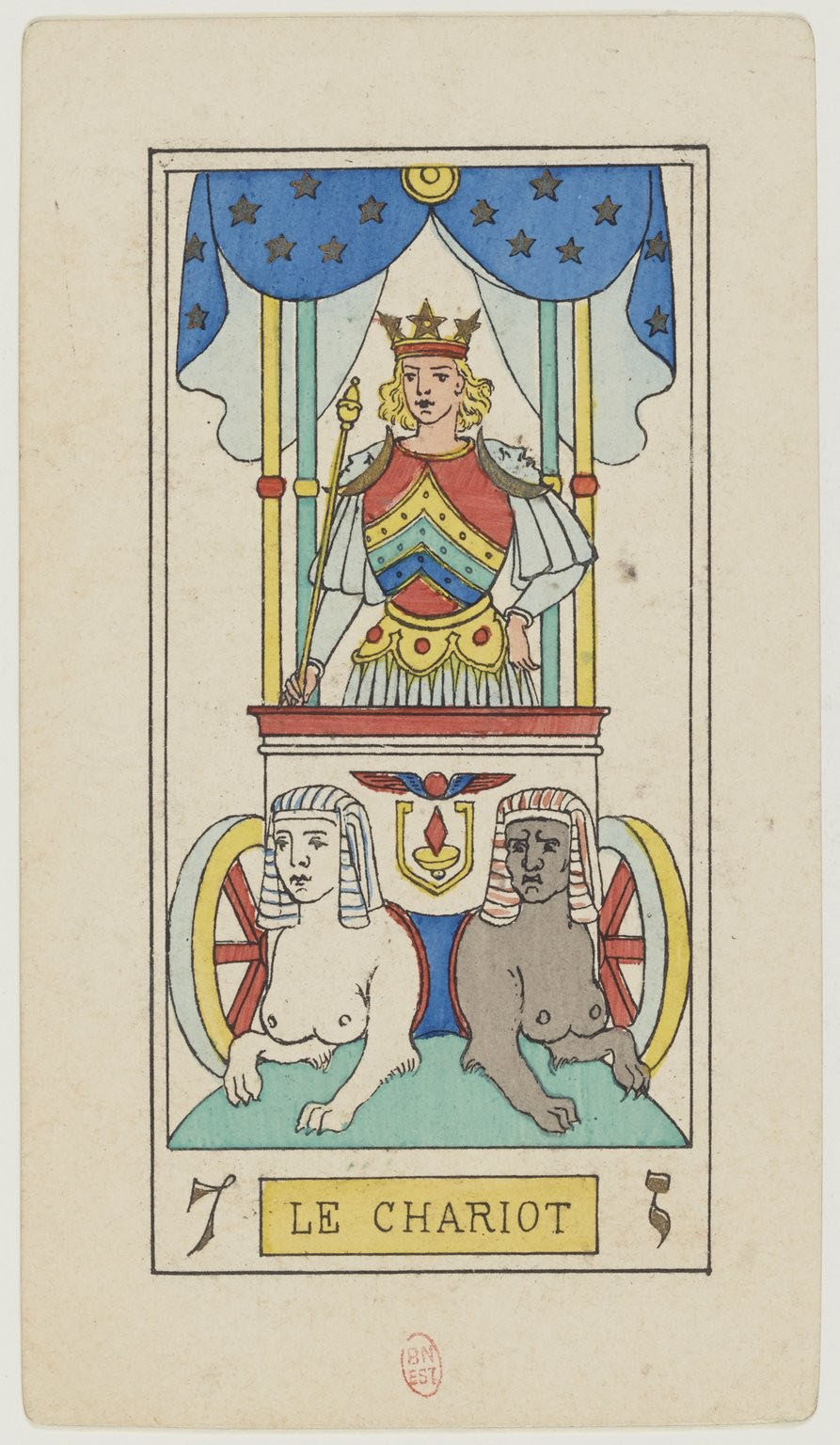
VII. Le Chariot
The Chariot

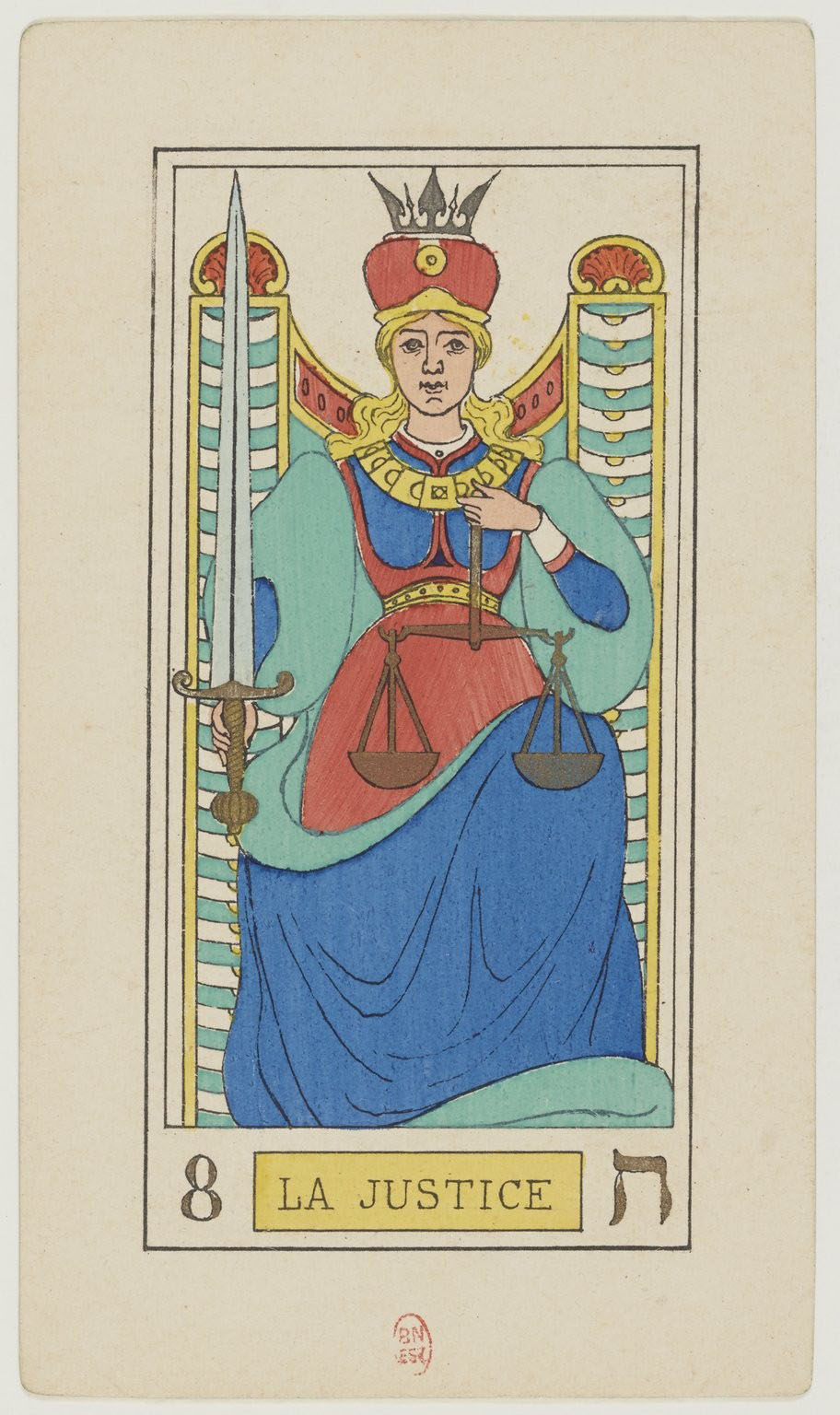
VIII. La Justice
Justice

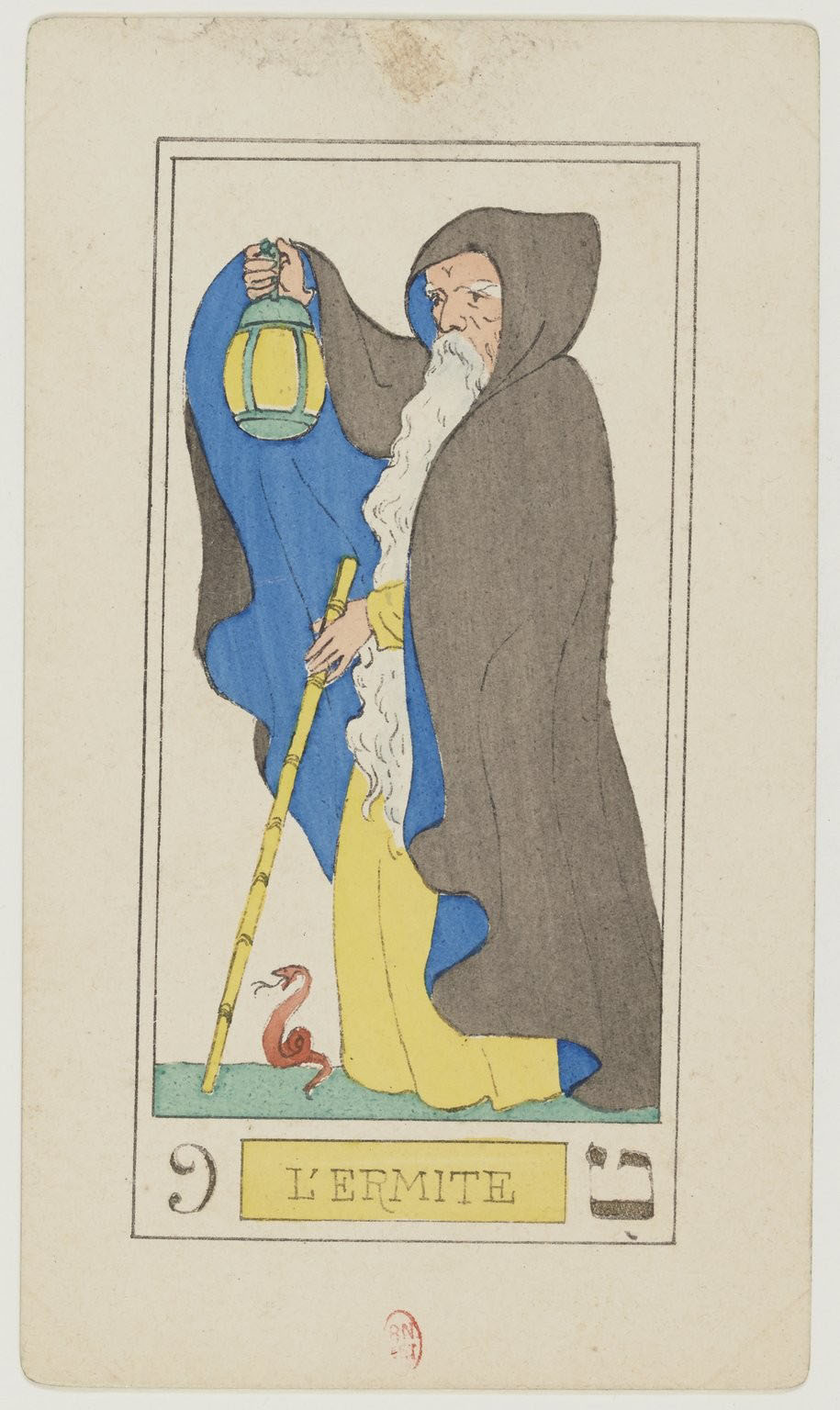
VIIII. L'Ermite
The Hermit

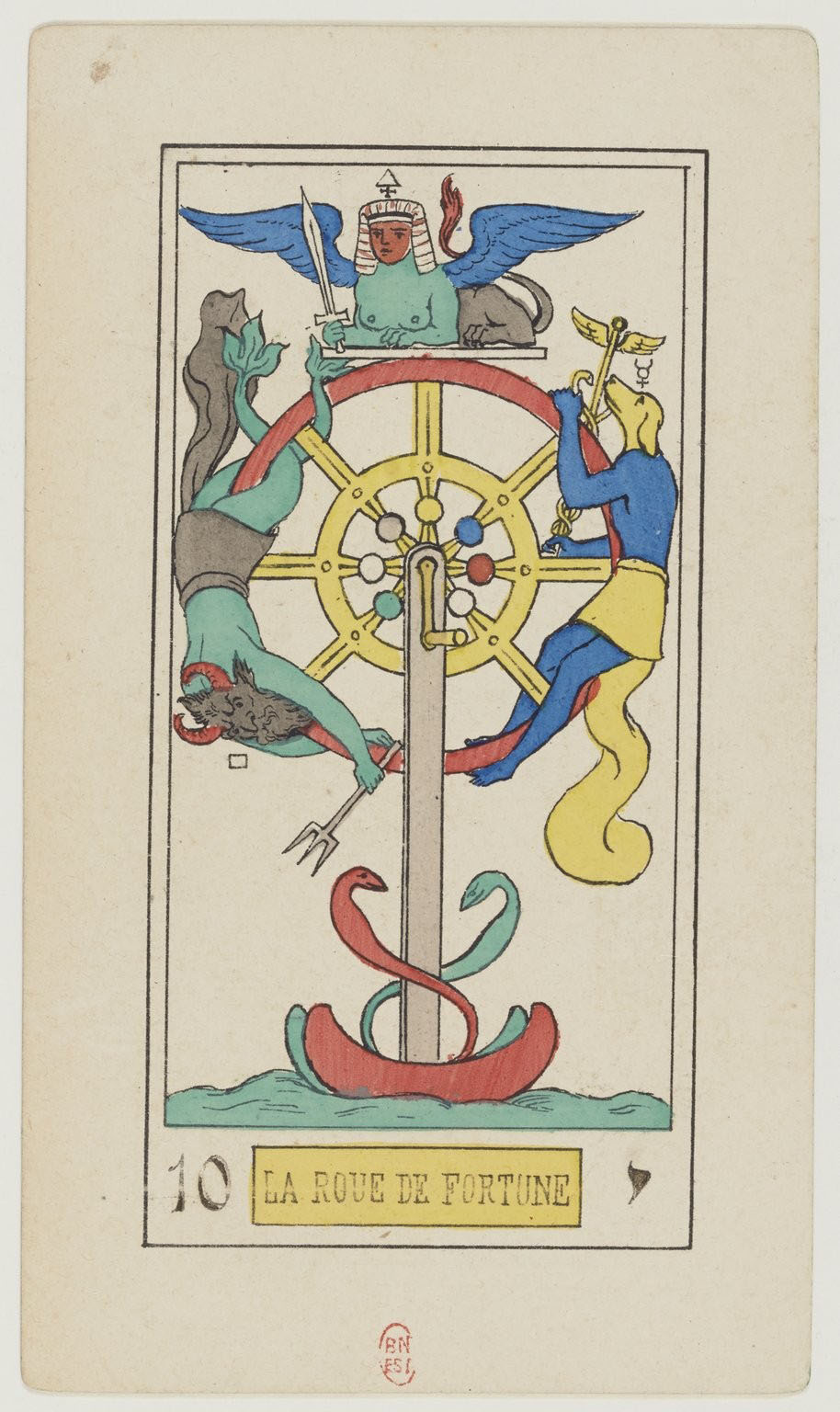
X. La Roue de Fortune
Wheel of Fortune

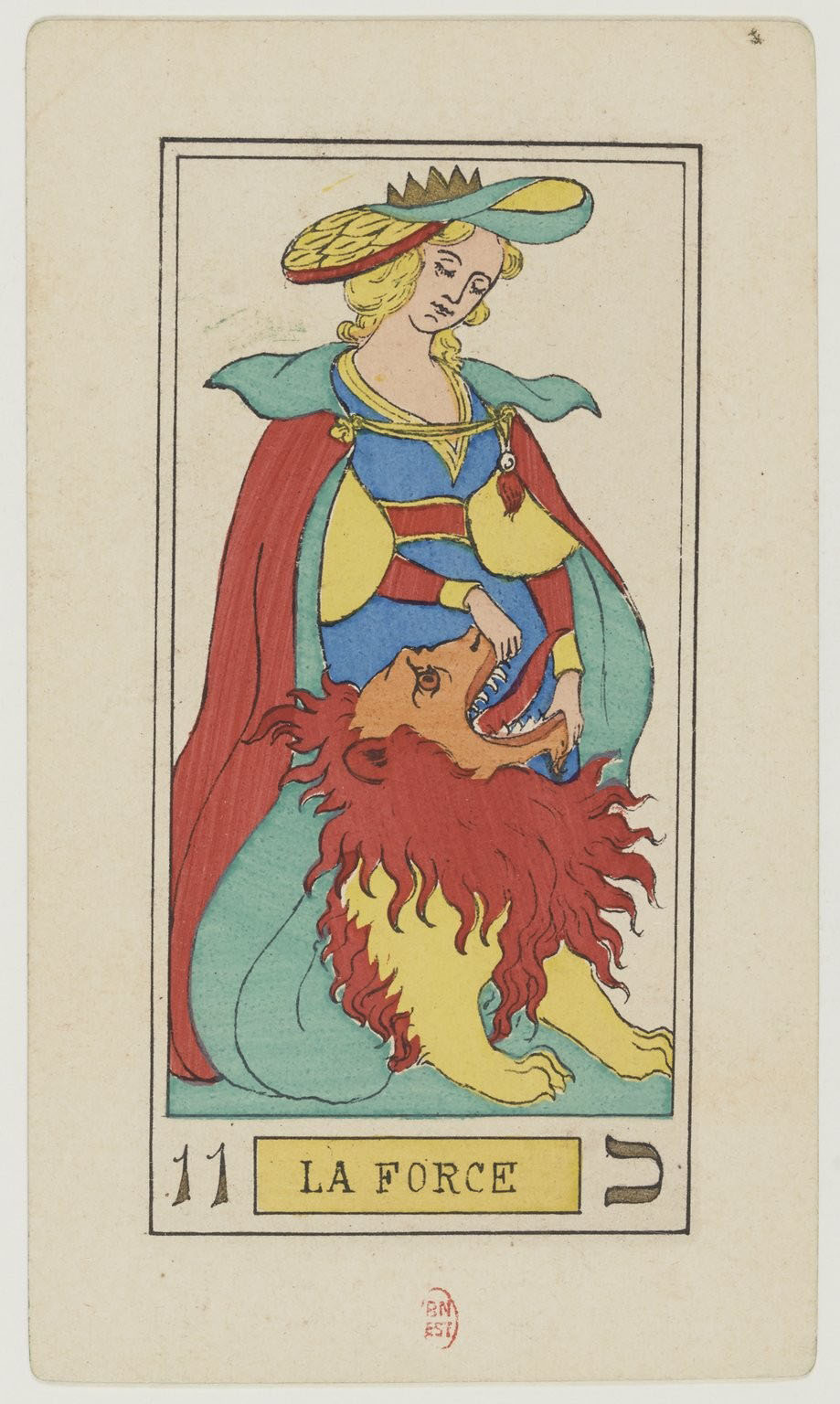
XI. La Force
Strength

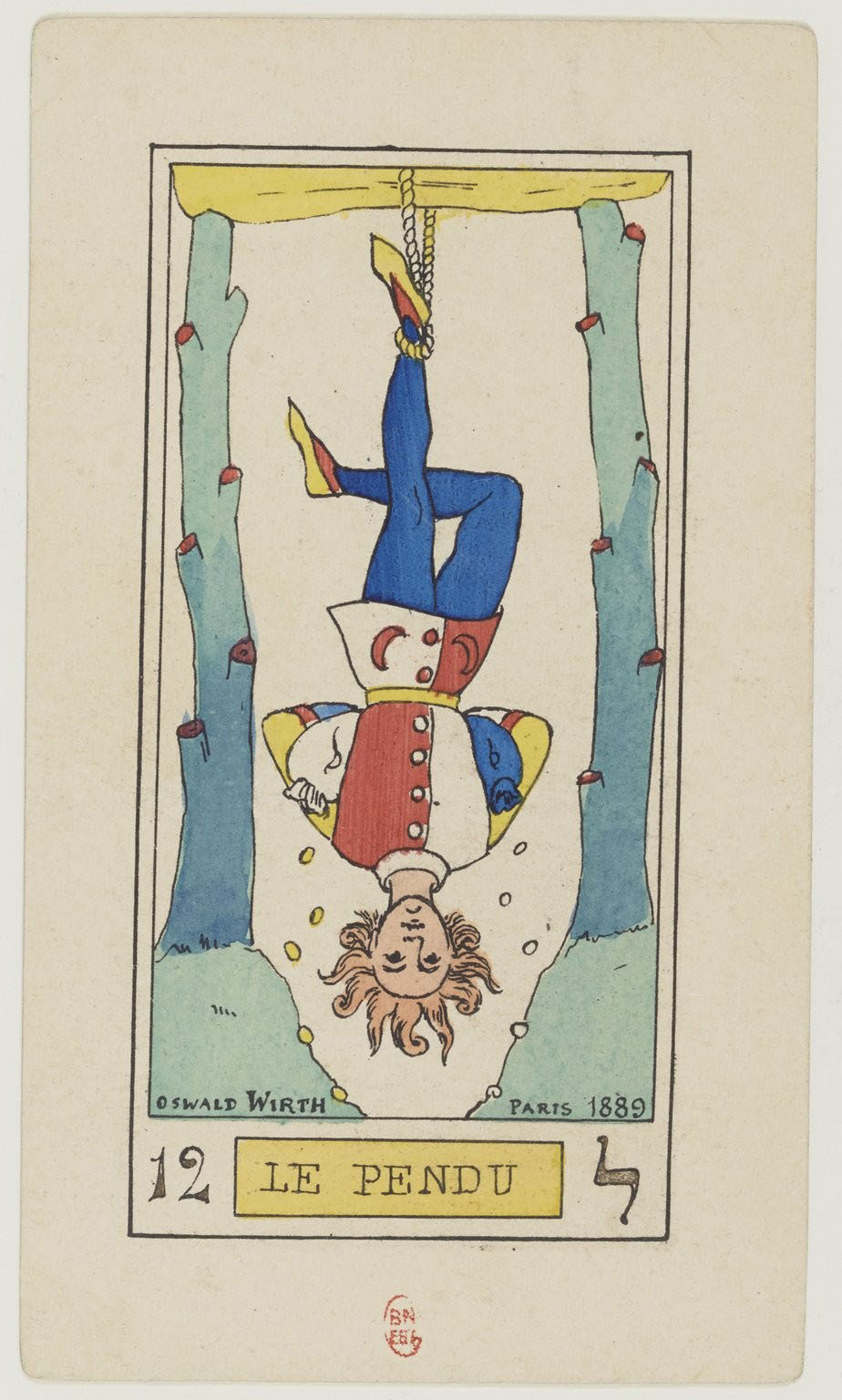
XII. Le Pendu
The Hanged Man

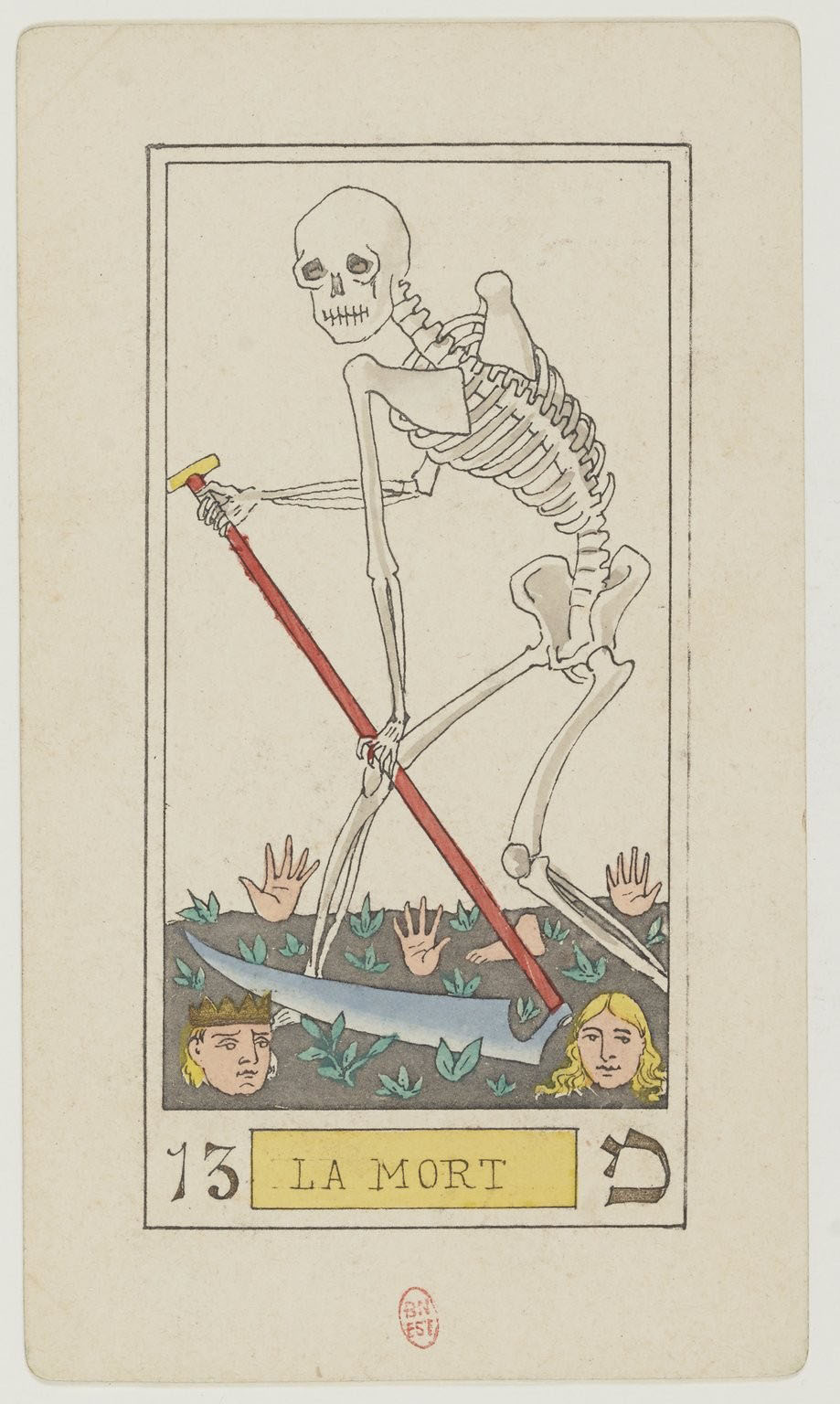
XIII. La Mort
Death

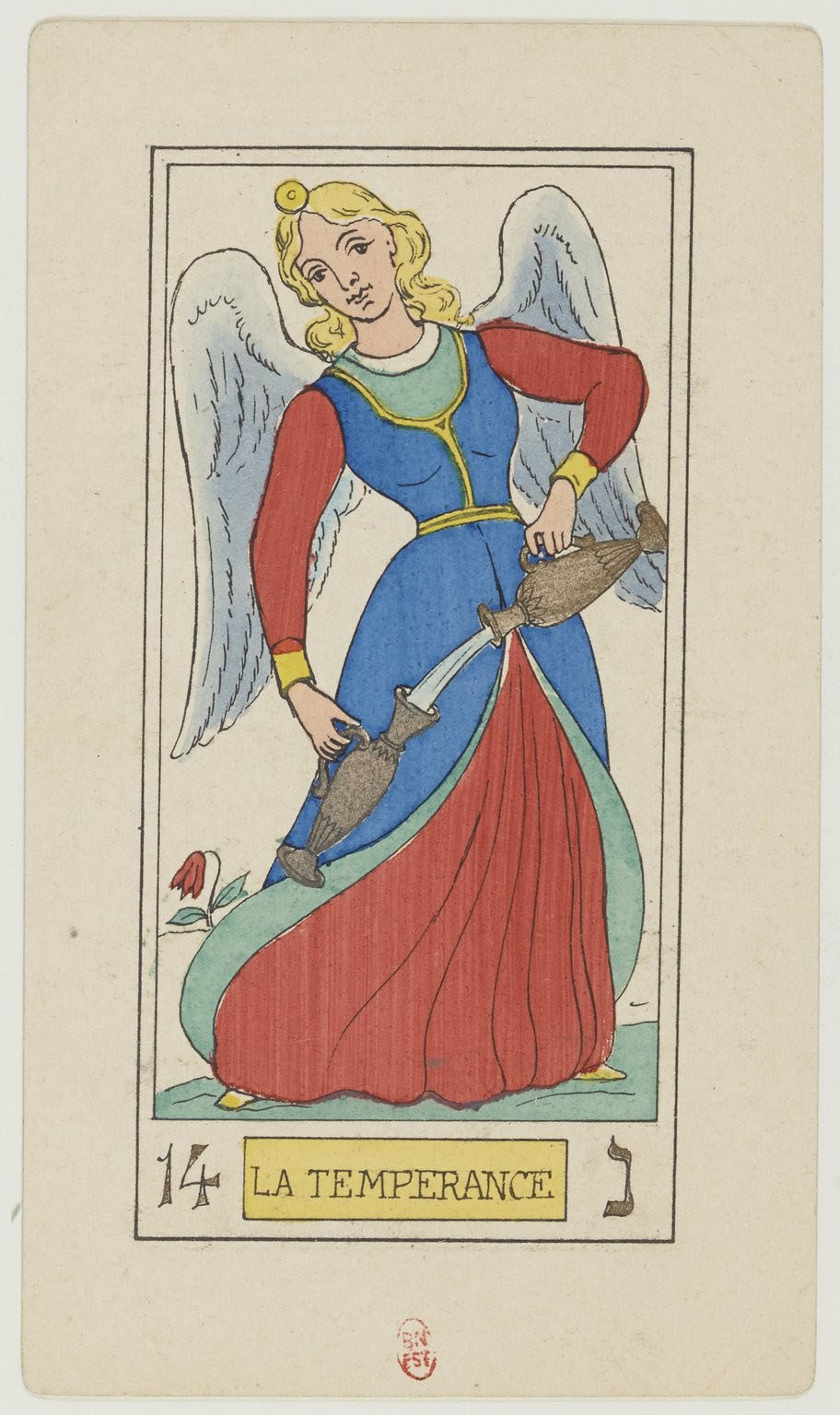
XIIII. La Temperance
Temperance

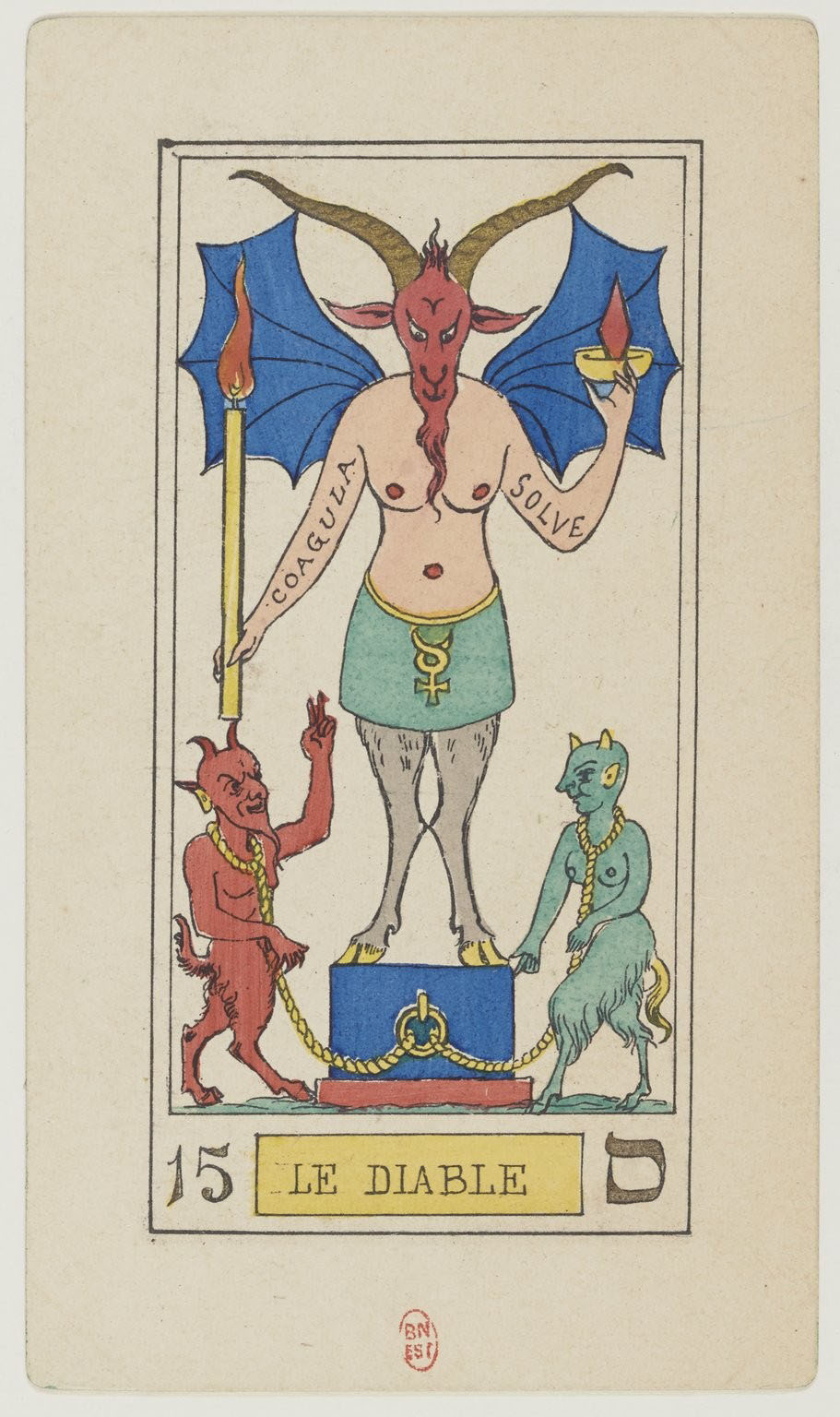
XV. Le Diable
The Devil

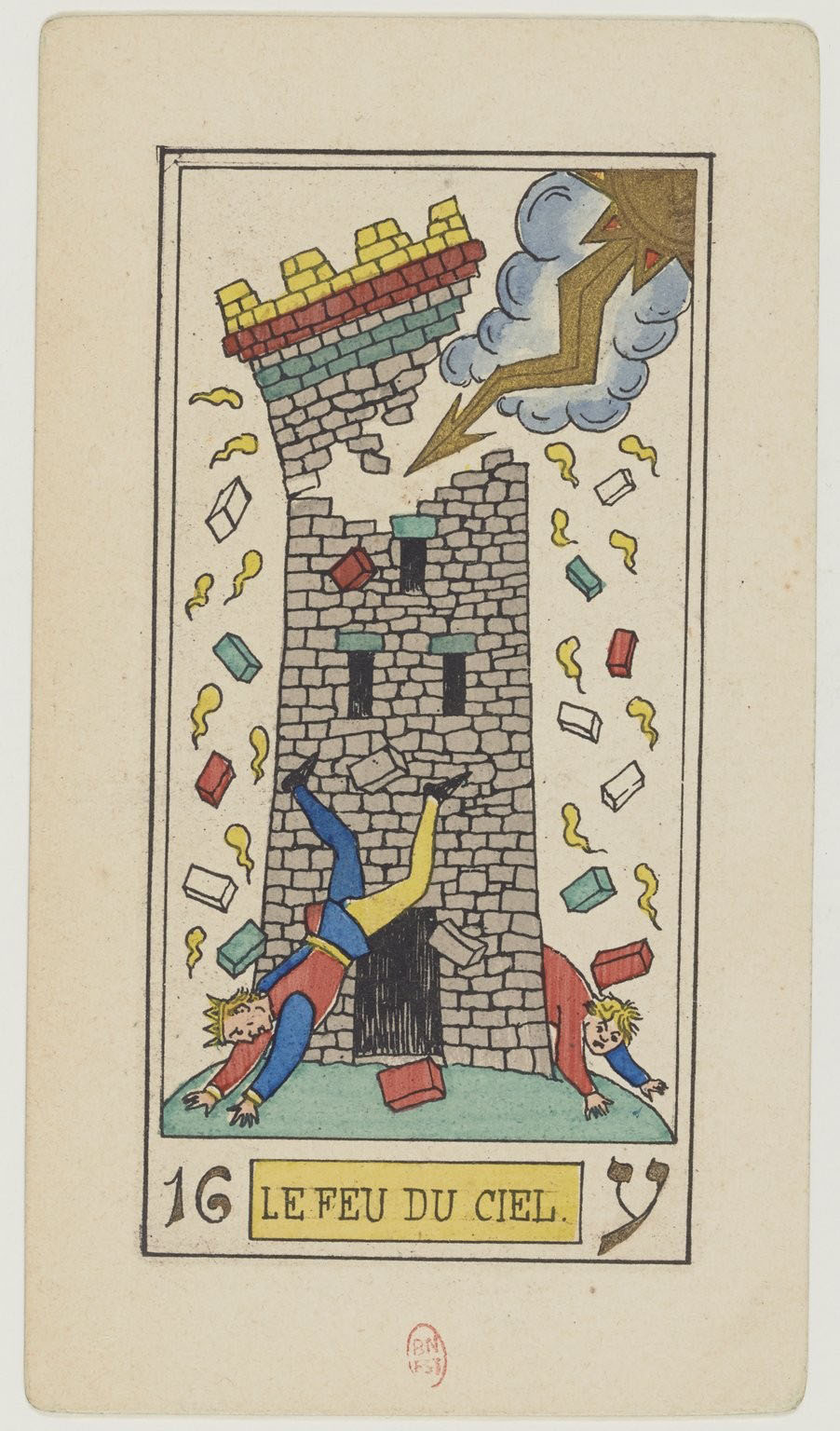
XVI. Le Feu du Ciel
The Tower

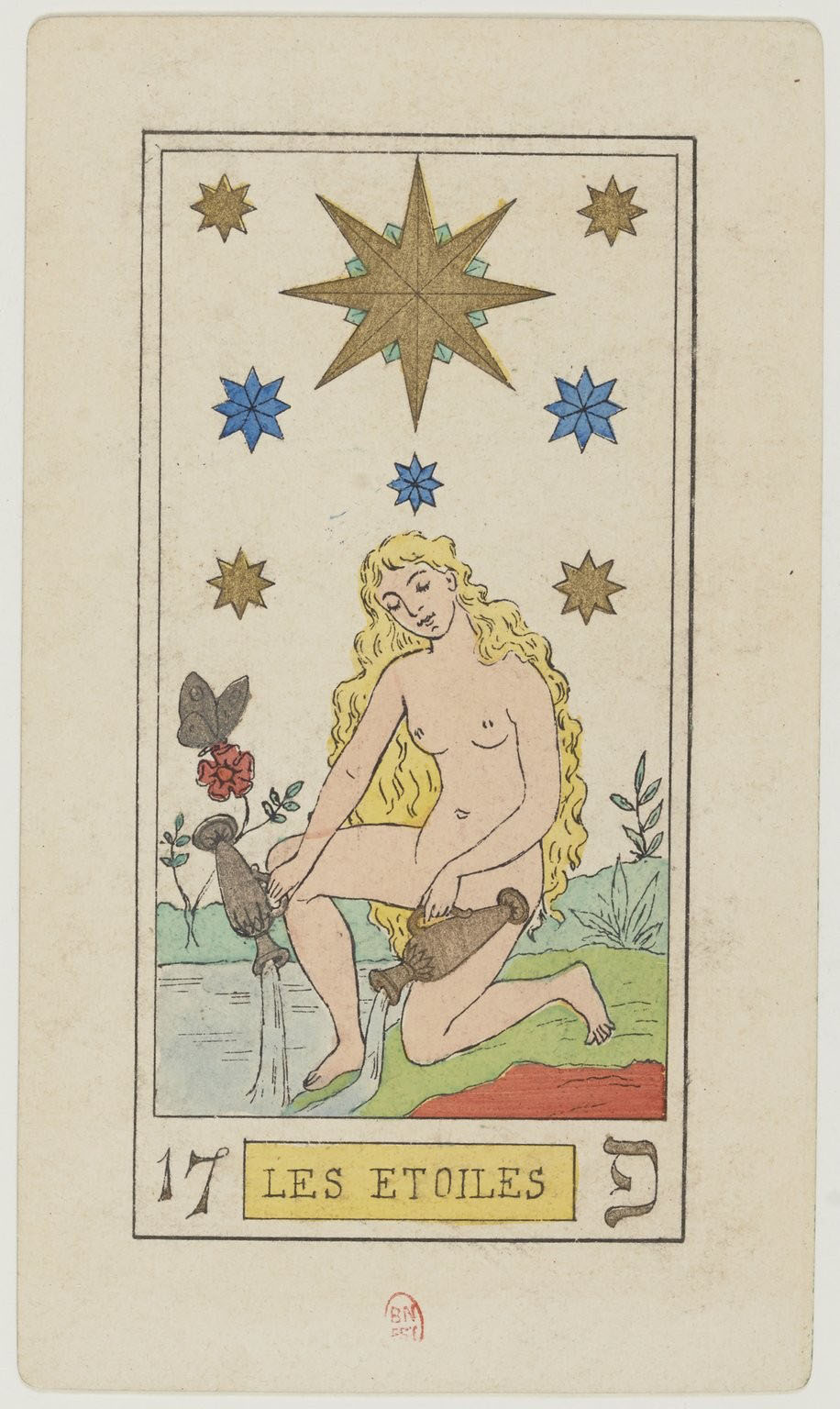
XVII. Les Etoiles
The Star

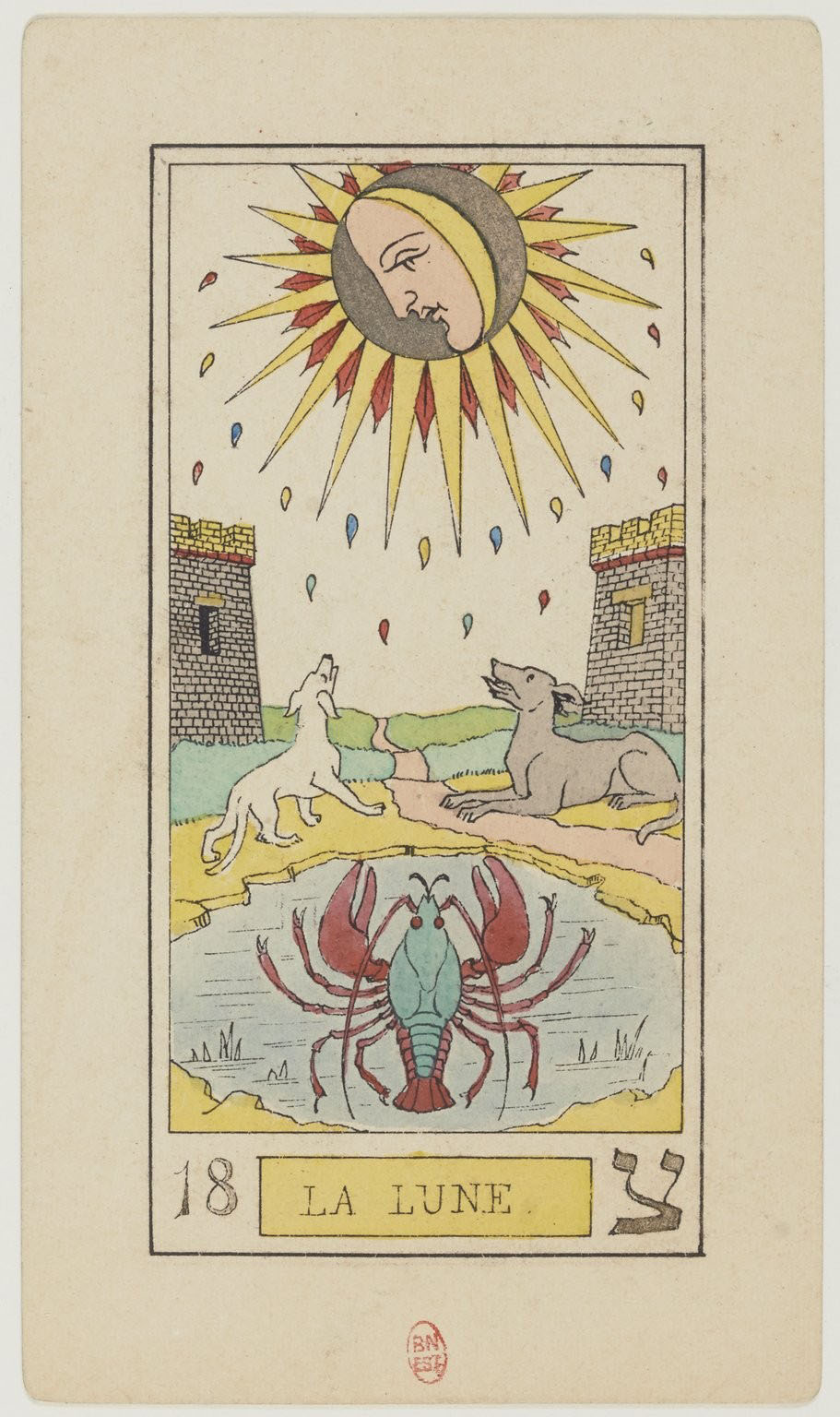
XVIII. La Lune
The Moon

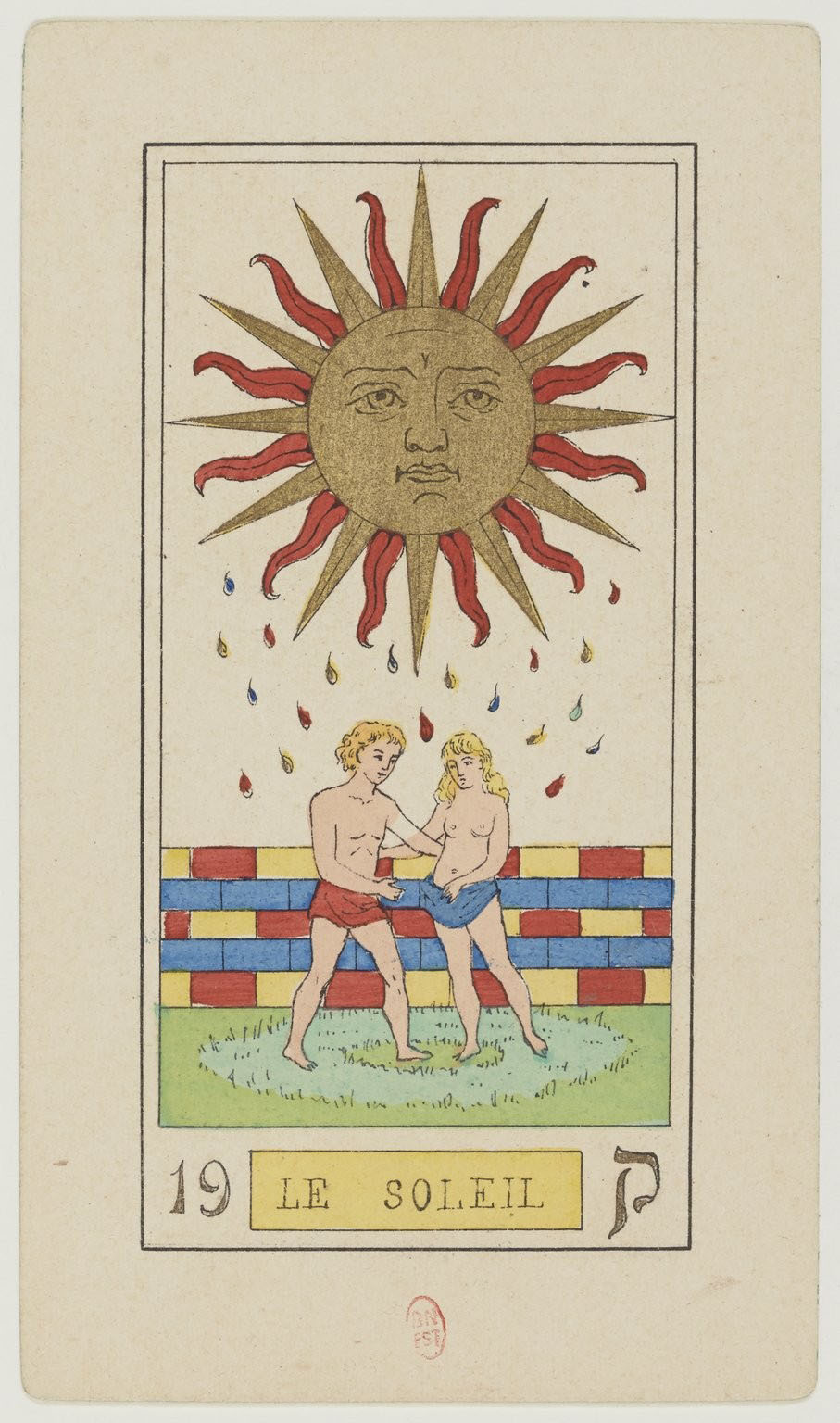
XVIIII. Le Soleil
The Sun

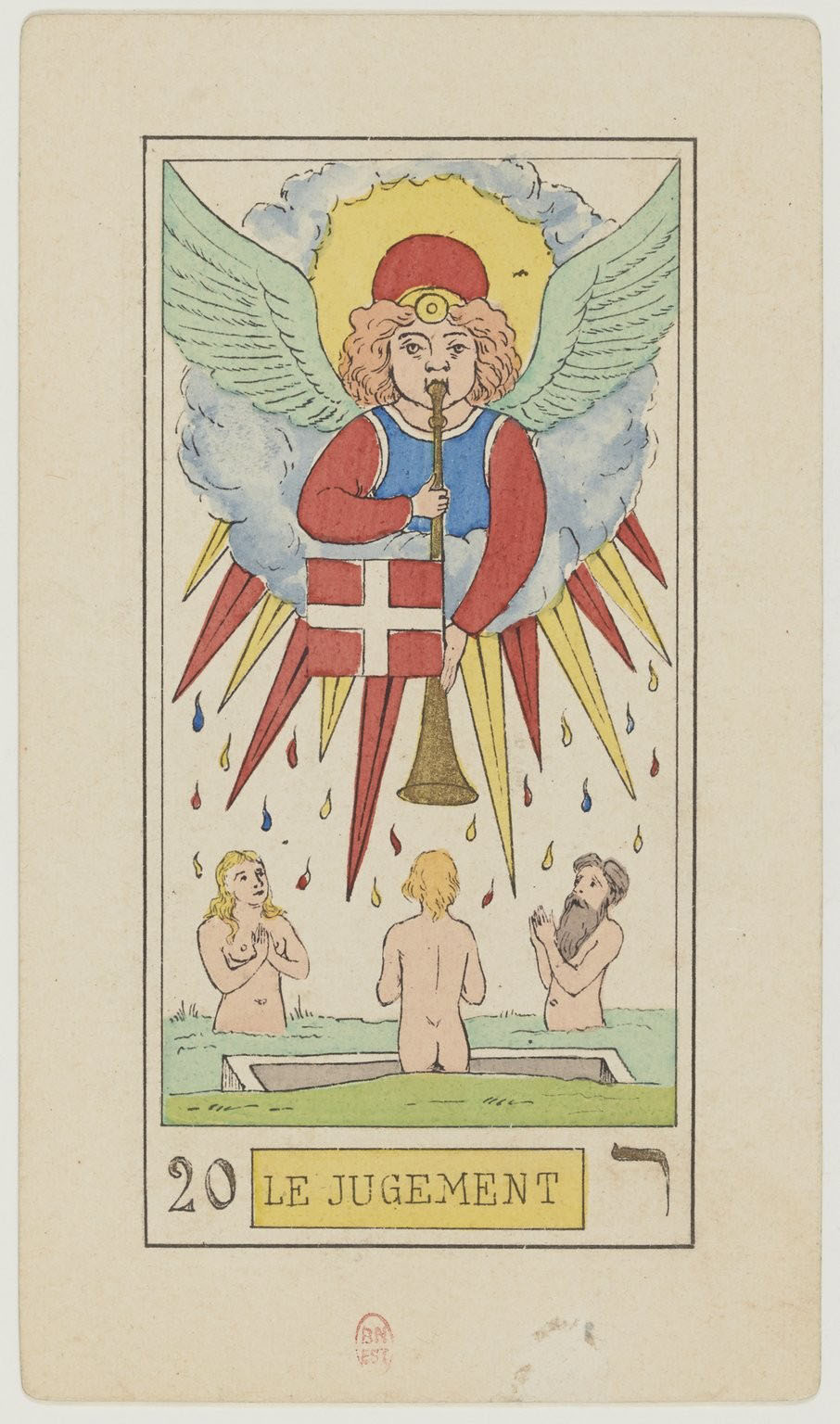
XX. Le Jugement
Judgment

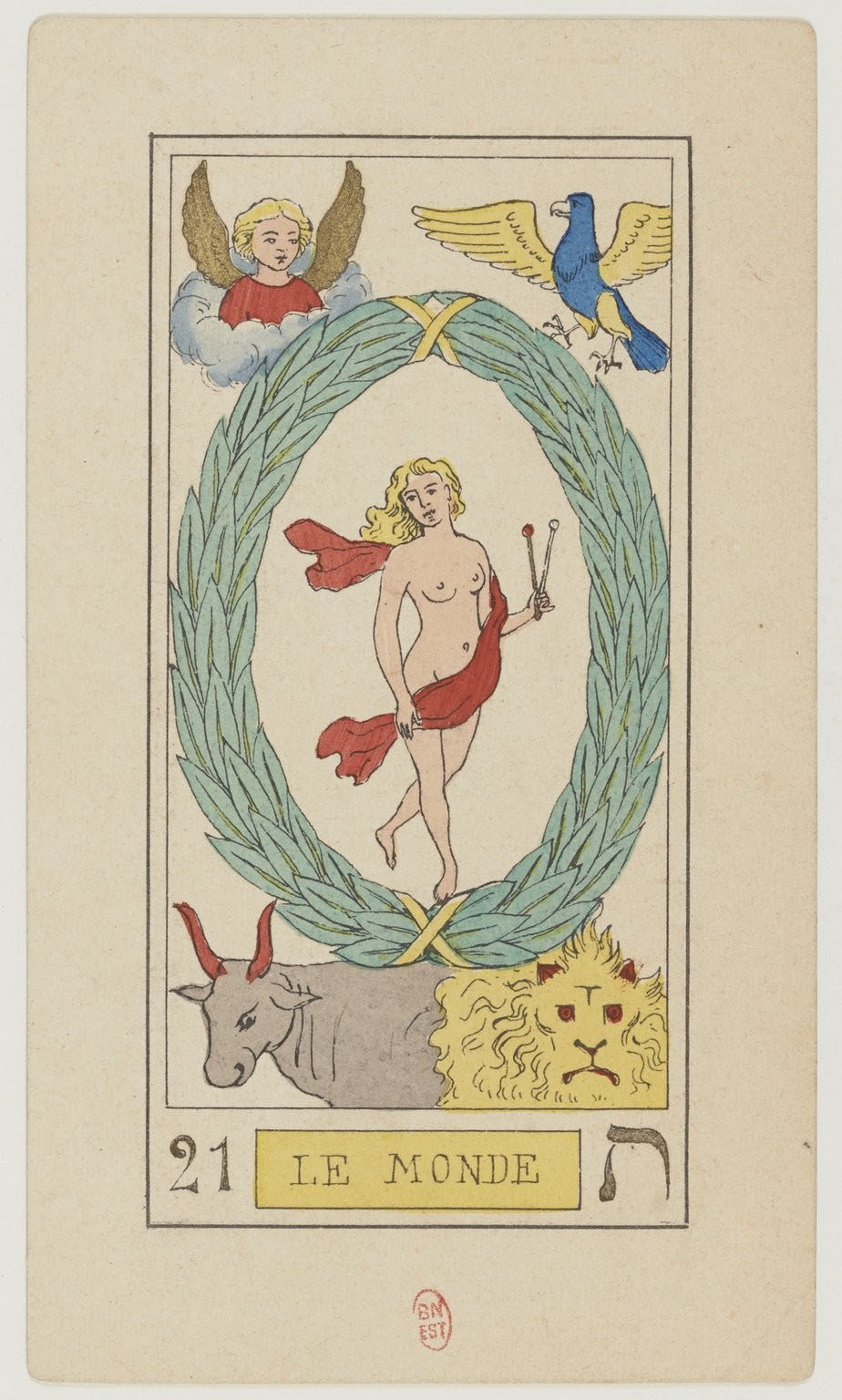
XXI. Le Monde
The World

== See also ==
- Oswald Wirth
- Tarot
