= Oswald Wirth =

Swiss artist and occult writer

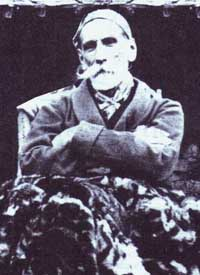
Oswald Wirth

Joseph Paul Oswald Wirth (5 August 1860, Brienz, Canton of Bern – 9 March 1943) was a Swiss occultist, illustrator and writer.

Oswald Wirth's long career writing about freemasonry and related esoteric topics appears to have begun in 1880 with an eight-page paper titled Catholicisme et Franc-Maçonnerie listed in the collection of the Bibliothèque nationale de France.

At age 23, he was initiated as a freemason.

In 1887, Wirth was practicing as a hypnotic healer or, as he described it, "curative magnetism," when he was introduced by a member of the clergy to Stanislas de Guaita. Wirth was impressed with de Guaita's knowledge of magnetic healing, and having dabbled in Theosophy, was grateful for De Guaita's introduction to the tarot as a magical system. This launched a decade-long role for Wirth as de Guaita's secretary, disciple, and fellow student of esotericism and symbolism.

By 1889, Wirth had created, under the guidance of de Guaita, a cartomantic Tarot consisting only of the twenty-two Major Arcana. Known as "Les 22 Arcanes du Tarot Kabbalistique", it followed the designs of the Tarot de Marseille closely but introduced several alterations, incorporating extant occult symbolism into the cards. Wirth's deck was featured in the 1889 book Le Tarot des Bohémiens by Gérard Encausse and listed as one of the eight most important modern tarot decks. The Wirth/de Guaita deck is significant in the history of the tarot for being the first in a long line of occult, cartomantic, and initiatory decks.

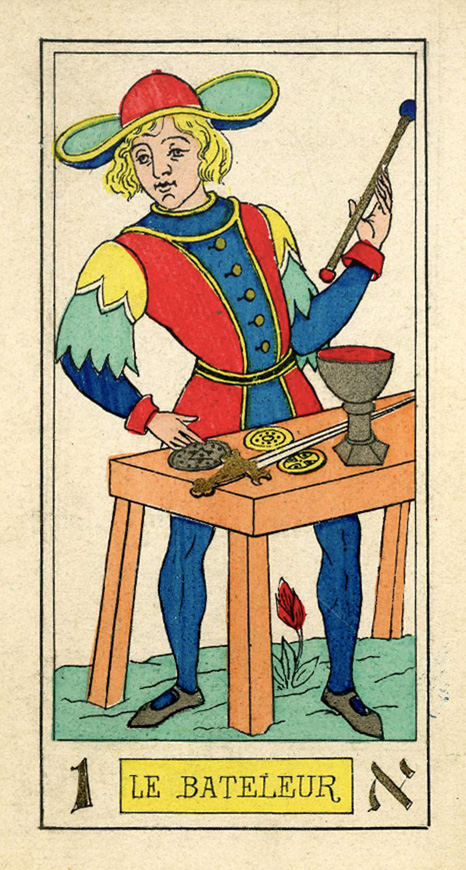
Magician card from Wirth's 1889 tarot deck

His interests also included Freemasonry and Astrology. He wrote many books in French regarding Freemasonry, most importantly a set of three volumes explaining Freemasonry's first three degrees.

Today, Wirth perhaps is best known as the author of Le Tarot des imagiers du Moyen Âge (1927), translated and published in English as The Tarot of the Magicians (2013).

On 28 January 1884 Wirth was initiated in the regular Scottish Rite Masonic Lodge La Bienfaisance Châlonnaise affiliated to the Grand Orient of France. In 1889, he joined the Scottish Rite Travail et les Vrais Amis Fidèles where he became Grand Master. In 1898, the latter lodge was admitted to the Grand Lodge of France.

Roughly a decade after his initiation into freemasonry, Wirth began publishing a series of books detailing the doctrine, philosophy and ceremonies of the order, La franc-maçonnerie rendue intelligible à ses adeptes: sa philosophie, son objet,sa methode, ses moyens. (Freemasonry made intelligible to its followers: its philosophy, its purpose, its method, its means.) The series launched in 1894 with Volume 1, Le Livre de l'Apprenti (The Apprentice's Book,) a manual for the use of new initiates. This was followed by volumes for second and third degree members. All three volumes saw revisions and reprinting into the 1930s.

Wirth acquired an international reputation as a masonic writer. In reviewing his 1909 book on Heremtic symbolism, the editor of The American Freemason hastened "to pay deserved homage to the genius and scholarship" of Wirth. "In the higher reaches of symbolic knowledge Brother Wirth stands almost without peer."

Circa 1910-1911, Wirth became one of the editors of a monthly masonic magazine published in Paris, La Lumière maçonnique : revue mensuelle de la maçonnerie universelle (Masonic Light: Monthly review of universal Freemasonry.) In 1912, he launched his own periodical,Le Symbolisme. Initially sub-titled, Organe du Mouvement universel de régénération initiatique de la franc-maçonnerie (Organ of the Universal Movement for the Initiatory Regeneration of Freemasonry,) it was later re-branded as Organe d'initiation à la philosophie du grand art de la construction universelle (Organ of initiation into the philosophy of the great art of universal construction.) The publication survived its founder's death and existed until 1971.

In addition to his book and periodical publishing, Wirth also gave public lectures on the topic of freemasonry. In 1912, Wirth was criticized for the "contemptible act" of "revealing the secrets of a society to which he has been admitted under the impression that he was a gentleman." In reply, Wirth stated that in his public lecture, he had "only said what one is permitted to say to the profanes." In contrast, others applauded his "white sessions" or public meetings to which men and women were invited to hear from Wirth expound on the principles of Freemasonry. Amidst the violence of World War I and the difficulties of its aftermath, Wirth's public presentations were praised as a "grand opportunity to raise high the torch of our fraternity and to let its beams of light comfort all who might come within the unbounded circle we proclaim.

Wirth died on March 9, 1943 at the age of 82.

== Works ==
- Le Livre de Thot comprenant les 22 arcanes du Tarot (1889).
- L'Imposition des mains et la médecine philosophale (1897), Paris.
- La Franc-maçonnerie rendue intelligible à ses adeptes, sa philosophie, son objet, sa méthode, ses moyens, three volumes:
  - Vol. I: Le livre de l'Apprenti : manuel d'instruction rédigé à l'usage des FF. du 1er degré (1893, 2nd revised edition 1908), Paris.
  - Vol. II: Le livre du Compagnon : manuel d'instruction rédigé à l'usage des FF. du 2° degré (1912), Paris.
  - Vol. III: Le livre du Maître : manuel d'instruction rédigé à l'usage des FF. du 3° degré (1922), Paris.
- Le Symbolisme hermétique dans ses rapports avec l'alchimie et la franc-maçonnerie (1910), Paris.
- Les Signes du zodiaque, leur symbolisme initiatique (1921), Paris.
- Le Serpent vert (1922) (translation and analysis of Das Märchen by Goethe), Paris.
- L'Idéal initiatique (1924), Paris.
- Le Tarot des imagiers du Moyen Âge (1927), Paris.
- Introduction à l’étude du tarot (1931), Paris.
- Les Mystères de l'art royal - Rituel de l'adepte (1932), Paris.
- Stanislas de Guaïta, souvenirs de son secrétaire (1935), Paris.
- Le Symbolisme astrologique : planètes, signes du zodiaque, maisons de l'horoscope, aspects, étoiles fixes (1938), Paris.
- Qui est régulier ? Le pur maçonnisme sous le Régime des Grandes Loges inauguré en 1717 (1938), Paris.

== See also ==
- Oswald Wirth Tarot
