= The Magician (tarot card) =

Tarot card of the Major Arcana

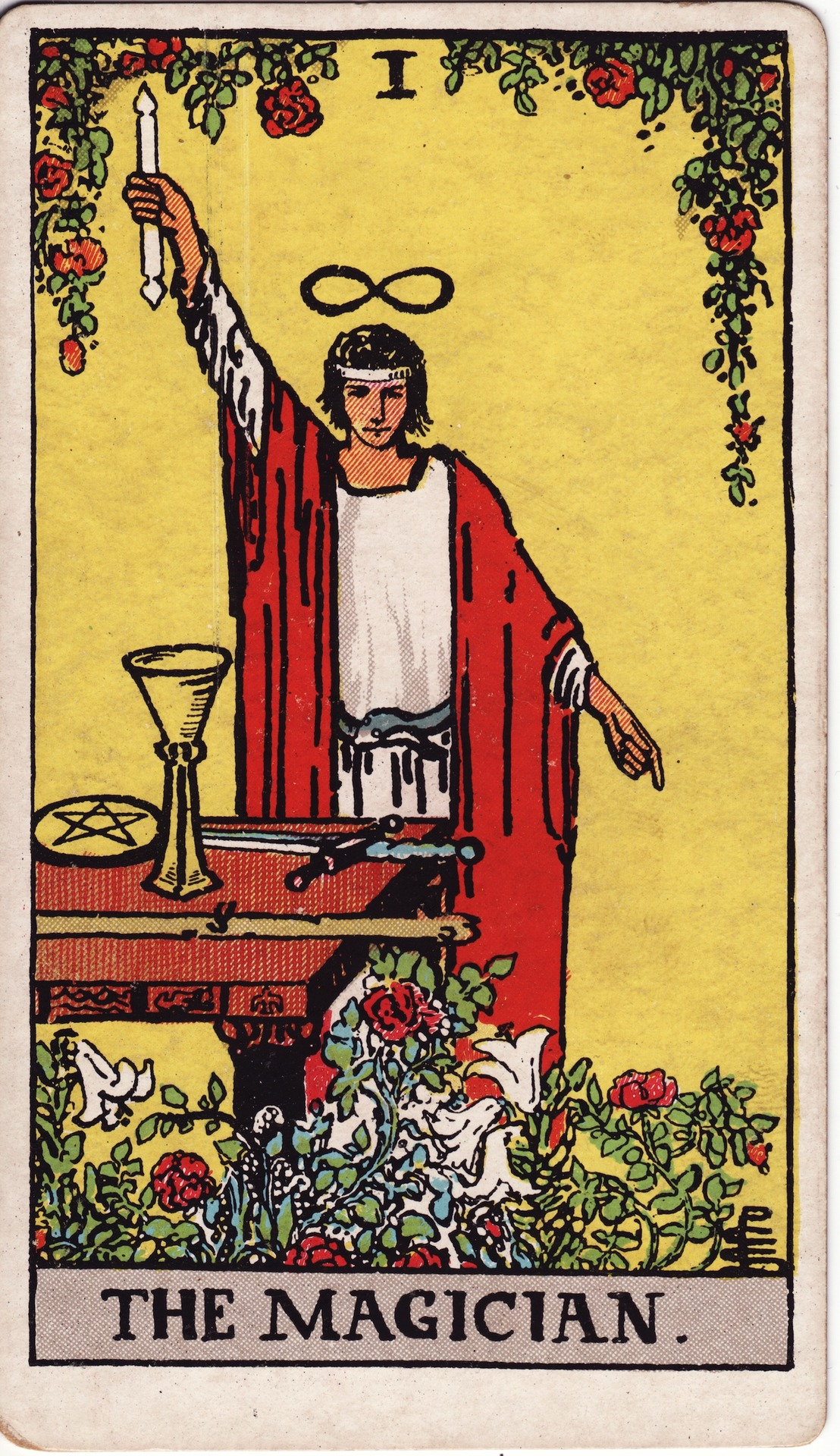
The Magician (I), from the Rider–Waite tarot deck

The Magician (I), also referred as to as The Magus or The Magus of Power in the Golden Dawn tradition, is the first trump or Major Arcana card in most traditional tarot decks. Historically known as The Juggler (from the French Le Bateleur), it is used in game playing and divination.

Within the card game context, the equivalent is the Pagat which is the lowest trump card, also known as the atouts or honours. In the occult context, the trump cards are recontextualized as the Major Arcana and granted complex esoteric meaning. The Magician in such context is interpreted as the first numbered and second total card of the Major Arcana, succeeding the Fool, which is unnumbered or marked 0 shopping. The Magician as an object of occult study is interpreted as symbolic of power, potential, and the unification of the physical and spiritual worlds.

== Iconography ==
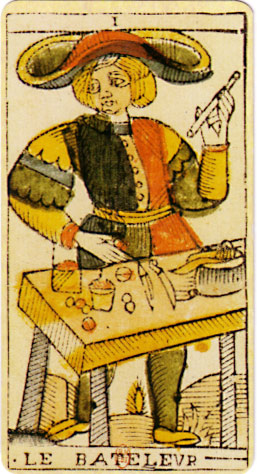
Le Bateleur, from the Tarot of Marseille

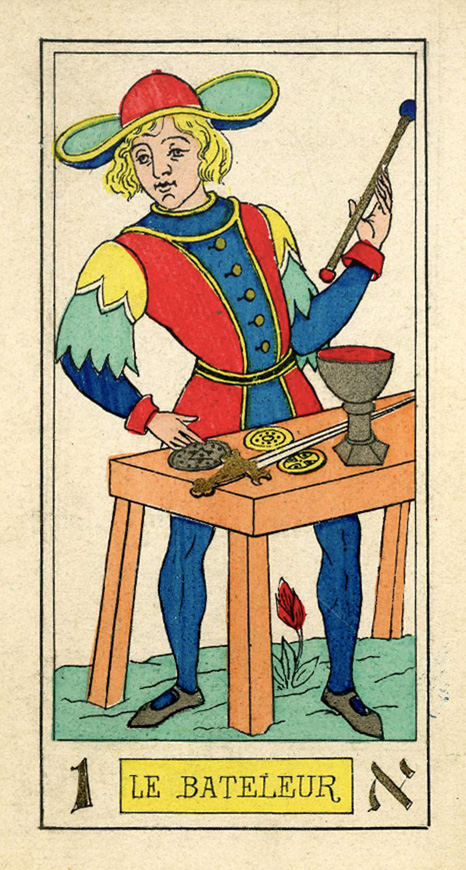
Le Bateleur from Oswald Wirth's 1889 tarot deck

In French Le Bateleur, "the mountebank" or the "sleight of hand artist", is a practitioner of stage magic.

The Italian tradition calls him Il Bagatto or Il Bagatello. The most ancient painted version of this card come from the Visconti-Sfoza Tarot (1460 ca), attributed to Bonifacio Bembo; here, the Magician appears to be playing with cups and balls. The Mantegna Tarocchi image that would seem to correspond with the Magician is labeled Artixano, the Artisan; he is the second lowest in the series, outranking only the Beggar. Visually the 18th-century woodcuts reflect earlier iconic representations, and can be compared to the free artistic renditions in the 15th-century hand-painted tarots made for the Visconti and Sforza families.

In esoteric decks, occultists, starting with Oswald Wirth, turned Le Bateleur from a mountebank into a magus. The curves of the magician's hat brim in the Marseilles image are similar to the esoteric deck's mathematical sign of infinity. Similarly, other symbols were added. The essentials are that the magician has set up a temporary table outdoors, to display items that represent the suits of the Minor Arcana: Cups, Coins, Swords (as knives). The fourth, the baton (Clubs) he holds in his hand. The baton was later changed to represent a literal magician's wand.

The illustration of the tarot card "The Magician" from the Rider–Waite tarot deck was developed by A. E. Waite for the Hermetic Order of the Golden Dawn in 1910. Waite's magician features the infinity symbol over his head, and an ouroboros belt, both symbolizing eternity. The figure stands among a garden of flowers, to imply the manifestation and cultivation of desires. The illustration also shows each of the suits in the Minor Arcana on the table in front of him.

== In the tarot game ==
In most tarot games, the Bagatto is the lowest ranking trump card but worth a lot of points. Therefore, many players want to take a trick when it is played. In most games played out of Italy, winning the last trick with it awards bonus points.

In tarocchini, the Bégato still serves as the lowest trump, but it has an added ability. During score counting, it and the Fool can function as limited wild cards known as counters (contatori). They can be used separately or together to fill missing gaps in combinations, though not to fill in two consecutive gaps in sequential combinations, or to replace the highest trump or kings. Both cards can be used in every sequence, but as the Fool cannot be captured while the Magician is vulnerable to capture, the player holding the Magician would want to use it only judiciously.

In Sicilian tarocchi, the Bagatto is the second lowest trump, outranking an unnumbered trump called Miseria of no significance.

== Symbolism ==
=== Rider–Waite ===
The Magician is depicted with one hand pointing upwards towards the sky and the other pointing down to the earth, interpreted widely as an "as above, so below" reference to the spiritual and physical realms. On the table before him are a wand, a pentacle, a sword, and a cup, representing the four suits of the Minor Arcana. Such symbols signify the classical elements of fire, earth, air, and water, "which lie like counters before the adept, and he adapts them as he wills". The Magician's right hand, pointed upwards, holds a double-ended white wand; the ends are interpreted much like the hand gestures, in that they represent the Magician's status as conduit between the spiritual and the physical. His robe is similarly also white, a symbol of purity yet also of inexperience, while his red mantle is understood through the lens of red's wildly polarised colour symbolism—both a representative of willpower and passion, and one of egotism, rage, and revenge. In front of the Magician is a garden of Rose of Sharon and lily of the valley (Note: These are described by Waite as flos campi and lilium convallium, in an apparent allusion to the biblical Song of Songs.) demonstrating the "culture of aspiration", or the Magician's ability to cultivate and fulfill potential.

=== Crowley-Thoth ===
The Magician is associated with the planet Mercury, and hence the signs of Gemini and Virgo in astrology.

=== Golden Dawn ===
In The Hermetic Tarot, The Magician poses dynamically on one side of the card, pointing his wand angled towards another man, who appears to be Hermes, floating in the air. The cup, sword, and pentacle are all on the ground around him, as well as a candle, dagger, and a wilted vase of flowers. On each end of the circle he stands in is all four Alchemical symbols of the basic elements.

=== Marseilles ===
Although the Rider–Waite Tarot deck is the most often used in occult contexts, other decks such as the Tarot of Marseilles usually used for game-playing have also been read through a symbolic lens. Alejandro Jodorowsky's reading of the Magician as Le Bateleur draws attention to individual details of the Marseilles card, such as the fingers, table, and depiction of the plants, in addition to the elements shared between the Rider–Waite and Marseilles decks. The Magician in the Marseilles deck is depicted with six fingers on his left hand (Note: The Magician holds his wand in his left hand in the Marseilles deck, as opposed to his right in Rider–Waite.) rather than five, which Jodorowsky interprets as a symbol of manipulating and reorganizing reality. Similarly, the table he stands behind has three legs rather than four; the fourth leg is interpreted as being outside the card, a metafictional statement that "[i]t is by going beyond the stage of possibilities and moving into the reality of action and choice that The Magician gives concrete expression to his situation".

Rather than flowers, the Magician of the Marseilles deck is depicted with a small plant between his feet. The plant has a yonic appearance and has been interpreted as the sex organs of either a personal mother or the abstract concept of Mother Nature.

== Divination ==
Like the other cards of the Major Arcana, the Magician is the subject of complex and extensive analysis as to its occult interpretations. On the broad level, the Magician is interpreted with energy, potential, and the manifestation of one's desires; the card symbolizes the meetings of the physical and spiritual worlds ("as above, so below") and the conduit converting spiritual energy into real-world action.

Tarot experts have defined the Magician in association with the Fool, which directly precedes it in the sequence; Rachel Pollack refers to the card as "in the image of the trickster-wizard". A particularly important aspect of the card's visual symbolism in the Rider–Waite deck is the magician's hands, with one hand pointing towards the sky and the other towards the earth. Pollack and other writers understand this as a reflection of the Hermetic concept of "as above, so below", where the workings of the macrocosm (the universe as a whole, understood as a living being) and the microcosm (the human being, understood as a universe) are interpreted as inherently intertwined with one another. To Pollack, the Magician is a metaphysical lightning rod, channeling macrocosmic energy into the microcosm.

According to A. E. Waite's 1910 book The Pictorial Key to the Tarot, the Magician card is associated with the divine motive in man. In particular, Waite interprets the Magician through a Gnostic lens, linking the card's connection with the number eight (which the infinity symbol is visually related to) and the Gnostic concept of the Ogdoad, spiritual rebirth into a hidden eighth celestial realm. Said infinity symbol above the Magician's head is also interpreted as a symbol of the Holy Spirit, the prophetic and theophanic aspect of the Trinity.

Like other tarot cards, the symbolism of the Magician is interpreted differently depending on whether the card is drawn in an upright or reversed position. While the upright Magician represents potential and tapping into one's talents, the reversed Magician's potential and talents are unfocused and unmanifested. The reversed Magician can also be interpreted as related to black magic and to madness or mental distress. A particularly important interpretation of the reversed Magician relates to the speculated connection between the experiences recognized in archaic societies as shamanism and those recognized in technological societies as schizophrenia; the reversed Magician is perceived as symbolizing the degree to which those experiences and abilities are unrecognized and suppressed, and the goal is to turn the card 'upright', or re-focus those experiences into their positive form.

== In art ==
The Surrealist (Le surréaliste), 1947, is a painting by Victor Brauner. The Juggler provided Brauner with a key prototype for his self-portrait: the Surrealist's large hat, medieval costume, and the position of his arms all derive from this figure who, like Brauner's subject, stands behind a table displaying a knife, a goblet, and coins.
